

322001–322100 

|-bgcolor=#E9E9E9
| 322001 ||  || — || September 1, 2005 || Kitt Peak || Spacewatch || WIT || align=right | 1.2 km || 
|-id=002 bgcolor=#d6d6d6
| 322002 ||  || — || October 13, 2010 || Catalina || CSS || ALA || align=right | 6.1 km || 
|-id=003 bgcolor=#d6d6d6
| 322003 ||  || — || November 3, 1999 || Heppenheim || Starkenburg Obs. || HYG || align=right | 2.9 km || 
|-id=004 bgcolor=#E9E9E9
| 322004 ||  || — || October 1, 2005 || Catalina || CSS || — || align=right | 2.8 km || 
|-id=005 bgcolor=#d6d6d6
| 322005 ||  || — || September 21, 2004 || Anderson Mesa || LONEOS || — || align=right | 5.0 km || 
|-id=006 bgcolor=#E9E9E9
| 322006 ||  || — || September 25, 2005 || Kitt Peak || Spacewatch || — || align=right | 1.8 km || 
|-id=007 bgcolor=#d6d6d6
| 322007 ||  || — || April 6, 2008 || Mount Lemmon || Mount Lemmon Survey || THM || align=right | 2.4 km || 
|-id=008 bgcolor=#E9E9E9
| 322008 ||  || — || October 23, 2006 || Mount Lemmon || Mount Lemmon Survey || — || align=right | 1.0 km || 
|-id=009 bgcolor=#E9E9E9
| 322009 ||  || — || August 3, 1997 || Xinglong || SCAP || — || align=right | 1.6 km || 
|-id=010 bgcolor=#d6d6d6
| 322010 ||  || — || February 6, 2007 || Mount Lemmon || Mount Lemmon Survey || CHA || align=right | 2.0 km || 
|-id=011 bgcolor=#E9E9E9
| 322011 ||  || — || November 17, 2006 || Mount Lemmon || Mount Lemmon Survey || — || align=right | 1.3 km || 
|-id=012 bgcolor=#fefefe
| 322012 ||  || — || April 15, 2005 || Catalina || CSS || V || align=right data-sort-value="0.96" | 960 m || 
|-id=013 bgcolor=#E9E9E9
| 322013 ||  || — || February 2, 2008 || Kitt Peak || Spacewatch || RAF || align=right | 1.2 km || 
|-id=014 bgcolor=#fefefe
| 322014 ||  || — || December 30, 2007 || Kitt Peak || Spacewatch || — || align=right | 1.1 km || 
|-id=015 bgcolor=#d6d6d6
| 322015 ||  || — || March 11, 2007 || Mount Lemmon || Mount Lemmon Survey || — || align=right | 3.0 km || 
|-id=016 bgcolor=#d6d6d6
| 322016 ||  || — || May 15, 2001 || Anderson Mesa || LONEOS || EUP || align=right | 4.7 km || 
|-id=017 bgcolor=#d6d6d6
| 322017 ||  || — || September 18, 2004 || Socorro || LINEAR || — || align=right | 4.0 km || 
|-id=018 bgcolor=#E9E9E9
| 322018 ||  || — || October 6, 1996 || Kitt Peak || Spacewatch || WIT || align=right | 1.4 km || 
|-id=019 bgcolor=#d6d6d6
| 322019 ||  || — || January 9, 2006 || Kitt Peak || Spacewatch || — || align=right | 3.7 km || 
|-id=020 bgcolor=#fefefe
| 322020 ||  || — || September 18, 1995 || Kitt Peak || Spacewatch || NYS || align=right data-sort-value="0.79" | 790 m || 
|-id=021 bgcolor=#d6d6d6
| 322021 ||  || — || January 10, 2007 || Mount Lemmon || Mount Lemmon Survey || — || align=right | 3.5 km || 
|-id=022 bgcolor=#d6d6d6
| 322022 ||  || — || January 4, 2006 || Kitt Peak || Spacewatch || — || align=right | 2.5 km || 
|-id=023 bgcolor=#E9E9E9
| 322023 ||  || — || August 26, 2005 || Palomar || NEAT || — || align=right | 2.6 km || 
|-id=024 bgcolor=#E9E9E9
| 322024 ||  || — || April 14, 2008 || Mount Lemmon || Mount Lemmon Survey || — || align=right | 2.3 km || 
|-id=025 bgcolor=#fefefe
| 322025 ||  || — || February 2, 2006 || Mount Lemmon || Mount Lemmon Survey || — || align=right | 1.1 km || 
|-id=026 bgcolor=#E9E9E9
| 322026 ||  || — || July 29, 2009 || Kitt Peak || Spacewatch || — || align=right | 3.1 km || 
|-id=027 bgcolor=#d6d6d6
| 322027 ||  || — || March 16, 2007 || Kitt Peak || Spacewatch || — || align=right | 4.3 km || 
|-id=028 bgcolor=#E9E9E9
| 322028 ||  || — || November 17, 2006 || Mount Lemmon || Mount Lemmon Survey || — || align=right | 1.3 km || 
|-id=029 bgcolor=#d6d6d6
| 322029 ||  || — || March 11, 2007 || Mount Lemmon || Mount Lemmon Survey || — || align=right | 2.5 km || 
|-id=030 bgcolor=#E9E9E9
| 322030 ||  || — || December 5, 1996 || Kitt Peak || Spacewatch || — || align=right | 2.6 km || 
|-id=031 bgcolor=#d6d6d6
| 322031 ||  || — || August 26, 2009 || Catalina || CSS || — || align=right | 4.3 km || 
|-id=032 bgcolor=#d6d6d6
| 322032 ||  || — || November 29, 2005 || Mount Lemmon || Mount Lemmon Survey || KOR || align=right | 1.7 km || 
|-id=033 bgcolor=#d6d6d6
| 322033 ||  || — || December 25, 2000 || Kitt Peak || Spacewatch || — || align=right | 2.6 km || 
|-id=034 bgcolor=#d6d6d6
| 322034 ||  || — || September 11, 2004 || Socorro || LINEAR || — || align=right | 3.9 km || 
|-id=035 bgcolor=#d6d6d6
| 322035 ||  || — || March 28, 2008 || Kitt Peak || Spacewatch || HYG || align=right | 4.0 km || 
|-id=036 bgcolor=#E9E9E9
| 322036 ||  || — || November 10, 2006 || Kitt Peak || Spacewatch || — || align=right | 1.3 km || 
|-id=037 bgcolor=#E9E9E9
| 322037 ||  || — || September 28, 2001 || Palomar || NEAT || — || align=right | 2.5 km || 
|-id=038 bgcolor=#E9E9E9
| 322038 ||  || — || August 28, 2005 || Kitt Peak || Spacewatch || — || align=right | 2.7 km || 
|-id=039 bgcolor=#E9E9E9
| 322039 ||  || — || March 26, 2003 || Kitt Peak || Spacewatch || — || align=right | 2.7 km || 
|-id=040 bgcolor=#E9E9E9
| 322040 ||  || — || September 3, 2005 || Palomar || NEAT || HOF || align=right | 3.4 km || 
|-id=041 bgcolor=#d6d6d6
| 322041 ||  || — || March 12, 2007 || Kitt Peak || Spacewatch || — || align=right | 4.6 km || 
|-id=042 bgcolor=#d6d6d6
| 322042 ||  || — || August 16, 2009 || Catalina || CSS || EOS || align=right | 3.0 km || 
|-id=043 bgcolor=#E9E9E9
| 322043 ||  || — || January 5, 2003 || Kitt Peak || Spacewatch || — || align=right | 1.8 km || 
|-id=044 bgcolor=#d6d6d6
| 322044 ||  || — || September 17, 2004 || Wise || D. Polishook || — || align=right | 3.9 km || 
|-id=045 bgcolor=#fefefe
| 322045 ||  || — || April 24, 2006 || Kitt Peak || Spacewatch || — || align=right data-sort-value="0.82" | 820 m || 
|-id=046 bgcolor=#E9E9E9
| 322046 ||  || — || August 27, 2001 || Palomar || NEAT || — || align=right | 2.3 km || 
|-id=047 bgcolor=#d6d6d6
| 322047 ||  || — || January 28, 2007 || Kitt Peak || Spacewatch || TEL || align=right | 1.4 km || 
|-id=048 bgcolor=#d6d6d6
| 322048 ||  || — || April 15, 2007 || Catalina || CSS || — || align=right | 4.4 km || 
|-id=049 bgcolor=#fefefe
| 322049 ||  || — || November 19, 2003 || Kitt Peak || Spacewatch || NYS || align=right data-sort-value="0.90" | 900 m || 
|-id=050 bgcolor=#E9E9E9
| 322050 ||  || — || September 8, 2001 || Anderson Mesa || LONEOS || ADE || align=right | 3.7 km || 
|-id=051 bgcolor=#d6d6d6
| 322051 ||  || — || November 5, 2010 || Kitt Peak || Spacewatch || ALA || align=right | 5.0 km || 
|-id=052 bgcolor=#d6d6d6
| 322052 ||  || — || September 7, 1999 || Kitt Peak || Spacewatch || — || align=right | 2.9 km || 
|-id=053 bgcolor=#fefefe
| 322053 ||  || — || July 9, 2002 || Palomar || NEAT || — || align=right data-sort-value="0.95" | 950 m || 
|-id=054 bgcolor=#E9E9E9
| 322054 ||  || — || February 18, 2008 || Mount Lemmon || Mount Lemmon Survey || NEM || align=right | 2.8 km || 
|-id=055 bgcolor=#E9E9E9
| 322055 ||  || — || December 16, 2006 || Kitt Peak || Spacewatch || — || align=right | 1.5 km || 
|-id=056 bgcolor=#d6d6d6
| 322056 ||  || — || December 6, 2005 || Kitt Peak || Spacewatch || EOS || align=right | 2.5 km || 
|-id=057 bgcolor=#d6d6d6
| 322057 ||  || — || October 4, 2004 || Kitt Peak || Spacewatch || — || align=right | 3.8 km || 
|-id=058 bgcolor=#C2FFFF
| 322058 ||  || — || September 30, 2010 || Mount Lemmon || Mount Lemmon Survey || L4 || align=right | 11 km || 
|-id=059 bgcolor=#E9E9E9
| 322059 ||  || — || October 12, 2005 || Kitt Peak || Spacewatch || AST || align=right | 1.6 km || 
|-id=060 bgcolor=#fefefe
| 322060 ||  || — || October 14, 1999 || Kitt Peak || Spacewatch || — || align=right | 1.0 km || 
|-id=061 bgcolor=#E9E9E9
| 322061 ||  || — || November 21, 1997 || Kitt Peak || Spacewatch || — || align=right | 1.9 km || 
|-id=062 bgcolor=#E9E9E9
| 322062 ||  || — || November 20, 2006 || Kitt Peak || Spacewatch || — || align=right data-sort-value="0.98" | 980 m || 
|-id=063 bgcolor=#E9E9E9
| 322063 ||  || — || September 21, 2001 || Kitt Peak || Spacewatch || — || align=right | 2.0 km || 
|-id=064 bgcolor=#E9E9E9
| 322064 ||  || — || February 6, 2003 || Palomar || NEAT || EUN || align=right | 2.3 km || 
|-id=065 bgcolor=#d6d6d6
| 322065 ||  || — || November 1, 2005 || Kitt Peak || Spacewatch || KAR || align=right | 1.5 km || 
|-id=066 bgcolor=#d6d6d6
| 322066 ||  || — || September 11, 2004 || Kitt Peak || Spacewatch || — || align=right | 2.6 km || 
|-id=067 bgcolor=#E9E9E9
| 322067 ||  || — || November 20, 2001 || Socorro || LINEAR || — || align=right | 1.7 km || 
|-id=068 bgcolor=#C2FFFF
| 322068 ||  || — || June 10, 2005 || Kitt Peak || Spacewatch || L4 || align=right | 12 km || 
|-id=069 bgcolor=#fefefe
| 322069 ||  || — || January 13, 2005 || Kitt Peak || Spacewatch || FLO || align=right data-sort-value="0.71" | 710 m || 
|-id=070 bgcolor=#d6d6d6
| 322070 ||  || — || September 5, 2010 || Mount Lemmon || Mount Lemmon Survey || — || align=right | 3.9 km || 
|-id=071 bgcolor=#C2FFFF
| 322071 ||  || — || November 6, 2010 || Socorro || LINEAR || L4 || align=right | 12 km || 
|-id=072 bgcolor=#d6d6d6
| 322072 ||  || — || October 6, 2004 || Socorro || LINEAR || LIX || align=right | 4.3 km || 
|-id=073 bgcolor=#d6d6d6
| 322073 ||  || — || November 10, 1999 || Kitt Peak || Spacewatch || IMH || align=right | 3.6 km || 
|-id=074 bgcolor=#E9E9E9
| 322074 ||  || — || April 13, 2004 || Siding Spring || R. H. McNaught || — || align=right | 1.7 km || 
|-id=075 bgcolor=#E9E9E9
| 322075 ||  || — || April 7, 2008 || Kitt Peak || Spacewatch || — || align=right | 1.8 km || 
|-id=076 bgcolor=#d6d6d6
| 322076 ||  || — || September 18, 2010 || Mount Lemmon || Mount Lemmon Survey || EOS || align=right | 2.6 km || 
|-id=077 bgcolor=#d6d6d6
| 322077 ||  || — || November 1, 2005 || Mount Lemmon || Mount Lemmon Survey || — || align=right | 2.8 km || 
|-id=078 bgcolor=#E9E9E9
| 322078 ||  || — || December 1, 2006 || Mount Lemmon || Mount Lemmon Survey || PAD || align=right | 1.9 km || 
|-id=079 bgcolor=#d6d6d6
| 322079 ||  || — || February 10, 2002 || Socorro || LINEAR || CHA || align=right | 2.2 km || 
|-id=080 bgcolor=#C2FFFF
| 322080 ||  || — || September 6, 2008 || Mount Lemmon || Mount Lemmon Survey || L4 || align=right | 7.3 km || 
|-id=081 bgcolor=#E9E9E9
| 322081 ||  || — || December 21, 2006 || Kitt Peak || Spacewatch || — || align=right | 2.3 km || 
|-id=082 bgcolor=#d6d6d6
| 322082 ||  || — || April 5, 2002 || Palomar || NEAT || — || align=right | 3.4 km || 
|-id=083 bgcolor=#E9E9E9
| 322083 ||  || — || January 27, 2007 || Kitt Peak || Spacewatch || AGN || align=right | 1.3 km || 
|-id=084 bgcolor=#d6d6d6
| 322084 ||  || — || August 15, 2004 || Campo Imperatore || CINEOS || HYG || align=right | 3.2 km || 
|-id=085 bgcolor=#E9E9E9
| 322085 ||  || — || March 11, 2008 || Kitt Peak || Spacewatch || NEM || align=right | 2.4 km || 
|-id=086 bgcolor=#E9E9E9
| 322086 ||  || — || October 17, 1996 || Caussols || ODAS || — || align=right | 2.7 km || 
|-id=087 bgcolor=#d6d6d6
| 322087 ||  || — || April 8, 2002 || Kitt Peak || Spacewatch || — || align=right | 4.8 km || 
|-id=088 bgcolor=#E9E9E9
| 322088 ||  || — || September 27, 2000 || Kitt Peak || Spacewatch || — || align=right | 2.4 km || 
|-id=089 bgcolor=#d6d6d6
| 322089 ||  || — || December 4, 2005 || Kitt Peak || Spacewatch || KOR || align=right | 1.5 km || 
|-id=090 bgcolor=#E9E9E9
| 322090 ||  || — || March 20, 2004 || Kitt Peak || Spacewatch || — || align=right | 1.8 km || 
|-id=091 bgcolor=#d6d6d6
| 322091 ||  || — || January 20, 2001 || Haleakala || NEAT || — || align=right | 4.5 km || 
|-id=092 bgcolor=#d6d6d6
| 322092 ||  || — || May 9, 2002 || Palomar || NEAT || — || align=right | 3.6 km || 
|-id=093 bgcolor=#d6d6d6
| 322093 ||  || — || December 7, 2005 || Kitt Peak || Spacewatch || — || align=right | 3.5 km || 
|-id=094 bgcolor=#E9E9E9
| 322094 ||  || — || September 14, 2005 || Kitt Peak || Spacewatch || — || align=right | 2.4 km || 
|-id=095 bgcolor=#d6d6d6
| 322095 ||  || — || March 14, 2007 || Mount Lemmon || Mount Lemmon Survey || HYG || align=right | 2.6 km || 
|-id=096 bgcolor=#d6d6d6
| 322096 ||  || — || October 24, 2005 || Kitt Peak || Spacewatch || CHA || align=right | 2.2 km || 
|-id=097 bgcolor=#E9E9E9
| 322097 ||  || — || October 9, 1993 || La Silla || E. W. Elst || — || align=right | 1.9 km || 
|-id=098 bgcolor=#d6d6d6
| 322098 ||  || — || November 26, 2005 || Mount Lemmon || Mount Lemmon Survey || — || align=right | 3.7 km || 
|-id=099 bgcolor=#d6d6d6
| 322099 ||  || — || December 22, 2005 || Catalina || CSS || — || align=right | 3.1 km || 
|-id=100 bgcolor=#E9E9E9
| 322100 ||  || — || March 10, 1999 || Kitt Peak || Spacewatch || — || align=right | 1.4 km || 
|}

322101–322200 

|-bgcolor=#fefefe
| 322101 ||  || — || January 16, 2005 || Kitt Peak || Spacewatch || — || align=right data-sort-value="0.93" | 930 m || 
|-id=102 bgcolor=#E9E9E9
| 322102 ||  || — || December 29, 1997 || Kitt Peak || Spacewatch || — || align=right | 2.7 km || 
|-id=103 bgcolor=#E9E9E9
| 322103 ||  || — || January 8, 1994 || Kitt Peak || Spacewatch || — || align=right | 2.7 km || 
|-id=104 bgcolor=#fefefe
| 322104 ||  || — || October 29, 2003 || Kitt Peak || Spacewatch || V || align=right data-sort-value="0.95" | 950 m || 
|-id=105 bgcolor=#d6d6d6
| 322105 ||  || — || December 2, 2005 || Kitt Peak || Spacewatch || — || align=right | 4.0 km || 
|-id=106 bgcolor=#E9E9E9
| 322106 ||  || — || January 23, 2003 || Kitt Peak || Spacewatch || — || align=right | 1.4 km || 
|-id=107 bgcolor=#fefefe
| 322107 ||  || — || September 24, 2000 || Socorro || LINEAR || — || align=right data-sort-value="0.86" | 860 m || 
|-id=108 bgcolor=#fefefe
| 322108 ||  || — || July 24, 2003 || Palomar || NEAT || FLO || align=right data-sort-value="0.74" | 740 m || 
|-id=109 bgcolor=#fefefe
| 322109 ||  || — || May 14, 2005 || Mount Lemmon || Mount Lemmon Survey || — || align=right data-sort-value="0.96" | 960 m || 
|-id=110 bgcolor=#E9E9E9
| 322110 ||  || — || March 19, 2004 || Palomar || NEAT || BRG || align=right | 3.0 km || 
|-id=111 bgcolor=#E9E9E9
| 322111 ||  || — || April 8, 2008 || Kitt Peak || Spacewatch || WIT || align=right | 1.2 km || 
|-id=112 bgcolor=#fefefe
| 322112 ||  || — || March 16, 2009 || Kitt Peak || Spacewatch || — || align=right | 1.1 km || 
|-id=113 bgcolor=#E9E9E9
| 322113 ||  || — || February 9, 2003 || Palomar || NEAT || — || align=right | 1.9 km || 
|-id=114 bgcolor=#d6d6d6
| 322114 ||  || — || December 8, 1999 || Kitt Peak || Spacewatch || — || align=right | 3.5 km || 
|-id=115 bgcolor=#fefefe
| 322115 ||  || — || August 27, 2003 || Palomar || NEAT || FLO || align=right data-sort-value="0.63" | 630 m || 
|-id=116 bgcolor=#fefefe
| 322116 ||  || — || September 22, 2003 || Kitt Peak || Spacewatch || FLO || align=right data-sort-value="0.64" | 640 m || 
|-id=117 bgcolor=#d6d6d6
| 322117 ||  || — || March 15, 2007 || Kitt Peak || Spacewatch || — || align=right | 3.6 km || 
|-id=118 bgcolor=#E9E9E9
| 322118 ||  || — || August 26, 2005 || Palomar || NEAT || — || align=right | 1.6 km || 
|-id=119 bgcolor=#E9E9E9
| 322119 ||  || — || October 28, 2006 || Mount Lemmon || Mount Lemmon Survey || — || align=right | 1.0 km || 
|-id=120 bgcolor=#d6d6d6
| 322120 ||  || — || September 21, 2003 || Kitt Peak || Spacewatch || 7:4 || align=right | 3.3 km || 
|-id=121 bgcolor=#fefefe
| 322121 ||  || — || April 10, 2005 || Mount Lemmon || Mount Lemmon Survey || — || align=right data-sort-value="0.87" | 870 m || 
|-id=122 bgcolor=#d6d6d6
| 322122 ||  || — || November 1, 2005 || Mount Lemmon || Mount Lemmon Survey || — || align=right | 3.2 km || 
|-id=123 bgcolor=#d6d6d6
| 322123 ||  || — || December 2, 2005 || Kitt Peak || Spacewatch || EOS || align=right | 2.5 km || 
|-id=124 bgcolor=#E9E9E9
| 322124 ||  || — || November 16, 2006 || Kitt Peak || Spacewatch || — || align=right | 1.2 km || 
|-id=125 bgcolor=#fefefe
| 322125 ||  || — || December 19, 2004 || Mount Lemmon || Mount Lemmon Survey || — || align=right data-sort-value="0.96" | 960 m || 
|-id=126 bgcolor=#d6d6d6
| 322126 ||  || — || October 9, 2004 || Socorro || LINEAR || — || align=right | 3.3 km || 
|-id=127 bgcolor=#E9E9E9
| 322127 ||  || — || April 26, 2000 || Kitt Peak || Spacewatch || — || align=right | 1.0 km || 
|-id=128 bgcolor=#E9E9E9
| 322128 ||  || — || January 10, 2003 || Kitt Peak || Spacewatch || — || align=right | 1.7 km || 
|-id=129 bgcolor=#d6d6d6
| 322129 ||  || — || October 13, 1993 || Kitt Peak || Spacewatch || EOS || align=right | 2.7 km || 
|-id=130 bgcolor=#d6d6d6
| 322130 ||  || — || September 16, 2009 || Mount Lemmon || Mount Lemmon Survey || HYG || align=right | 3.2 km || 
|-id=131 bgcolor=#d6d6d6
| 322131 ||  || — || May 27, 2008 || Kitt Peak || Spacewatch || — || align=right | 3.9 km || 
|-id=132 bgcolor=#E9E9E9
| 322132 ||  || — || November 20, 2006 || Kitt Peak || Spacewatch || GEF || align=right | 1.6 km || 
|-id=133 bgcolor=#E9E9E9
| 322133 ||  || — || April 5, 2003 || Kitt Peak || Spacewatch || — || align=right | 2.7 km || 
|-id=134 bgcolor=#E9E9E9
| 322134 ||  || — || July 29, 2005 || Siding Spring || SSS || — || align=right | 1.7 km || 
|-id=135 bgcolor=#E9E9E9
| 322135 ||  || — || July 19, 2009 || Siding Spring || SSS || MAR || align=right | 1.4 km || 
|-id=136 bgcolor=#E9E9E9
| 322136 ||  || — || September 28, 2006 || Mount Lemmon || Mount Lemmon Survey || — || align=right | 1.6 km || 
|-id=137 bgcolor=#C2FFFF
| 322137 ||  || — || September 5, 2008 || Kitt Peak || Spacewatch || L4 || align=right | 11 km || 
|-id=138 bgcolor=#E9E9E9
| 322138 ||  || — || March 27, 2003 || Anderson Mesa || LONEOS || — || align=right | 3.0 km || 
|-id=139 bgcolor=#E9E9E9
| 322139 ||  || — || June 29, 2005 || Kitt Peak || Spacewatch || — || align=right | 1.3 km || 
|-id=140 bgcolor=#d6d6d6
| 322140 ||  || — || April 28, 2003 || Kitt Peak || Spacewatch || — || align=right | 4.5 km || 
|-id=141 bgcolor=#E9E9E9
| 322141 ||  || — || February 28, 2008 || Kitt Peak || Spacewatch || — || align=right | 1.6 km || 
|-id=142 bgcolor=#d6d6d6
| 322142 ||  || — || September 30, 2005 || Mount Lemmon || Mount Lemmon Survey || KAR || align=right data-sort-value="0.98" | 980 m || 
|-id=143 bgcolor=#E9E9E9
| 322143 ||  || — || March 18, 1999 || Kitt Peak || Spacewatch || — || align=right | 1.4 km || 
|-id=144 bgcolor=#E9E9E9
| 322144 ||  || — || November 25, 2006 || Kitt Peak || Spacewatch || — || align=right | 1.2 km || 
|-id=145 bgcolor=#d6d6d6
| 322145 ||  || — || September 29, 2005 || Goodricke-Pigott || R. A. Tucker || — || align=right | 3.7 km || 
|-id=146 bgcolor=#d6d6d6
| 322146 ||  || — || January 15, 2002 || Kitt Peak || Spacewatch || KOR || align=right | 1.7 km || 
|-id=147 bgcolor=#E9E9E9
| 322147 ||  || — || March 24, 2003 || Kitt Peak || Spacewatch || AGN || align=right | 1.3 km || 
|-id=148 bgcolor=#E9E9E9
| 322148 ||  || — || August 29, 2005 || Kitt Peak || Spacewatch || HEN || align=right | 1.0 km || 
|-id=149 bgcolor=#d6d6d6
| 322149 ||  || — || May 18, 2002 || Palomar || NEAT || HYG || align=right | 3.1 km || 
|-id=150 bgcolor=#d6d6d6
| 322150 ||  || — || August 23, 2004 || Kitt Peak || Spacewatch || HYG || align=right | 2.5 km || 
|-id=151 bgcolor=#d6d6d6
| 322151 ||  || — || April 13, 2002 || Palomar || NEAT || HYG || align=right | 3.4 km || 
|-id=152 bgcolor=#E9E9E9
| 322152 ||  || — || October 24, 2005 || Kitt Peak || Spacewatch || — || align=right | 2.3 km || 
|-id=153 bgcolor=#d6d6d6
| 322153 ||  || — || October 2, 1995 || Kitt Peak || Spacewatch || KAR || align=right | 1.5 km || 
|-id=154 bgcolor=#E9E9E9
| 322154 ||  || — || February 9, 1999 || Kitt Peak || Spacewatch || — || align=right | 1.5 km || 
|-id=155 bgcolor=#d6d6d6
| 322155 ||  || — || January 9, 2006 || Kitt Peak || Spacewatch || — || align=right | 3.9 km || 
|-id=156 bgcolor=#d6d6d6
| 322156 ||  || — || September 14, 1994 || Kitt Peak || Spacewatch || — || align=right | 3.1 km || 
|-id=157 bgcolor=#C2FFFF
| 322157 ||  || — || September 27, 2009 || Mount Lemmon || Mount Lemmon Survey || L4 || align=right | 9.3 km || 
|-id=158 bgcolor=#E9E9E9
| 322158 ||  || — || October 1, 2005 || Kitt Peak || Spacewatch || HOF || align=right | 2.9 km || 
|-id=159 bgcolor=#d6d6d6
| 322159 ||  || — || October 2, 1999 || Kitt Peak || Spacewatch || — || align=right | 3.2 km || 
|-id=160 bgcolor=#d6d6d6
| 322160 ||  || — || October 9, 2004 || Anderson Mesa || LONEOS || EOS || align=right | 2.5 km || 
|-id=161 bgcolor=#d6d6d6
| 322161 ||  || — || February 8, 2002 || Kitt Peak || M. W. Buie || — || align=right | 2.7 km || 
|-id=162 bgcolor=#d6d6d6
| 322162 ||  || — || November 6, 2010 || Kitt Peak || Spacewatch || EOS || align=right | 2.9 km || 
|-id=163 bgcolor=#d6d6d6
| 322163 ||  || — || May 12, 2002 || Palomar || NEAT || — || align=right | 4.5 km || 
|-id=164 bgcolor=#d6d6d6
| 322164 ||  || — || January 20, 2006 || Kitt Peak || Spacewatch || HYG || align=right | 3.0 km || 
|-id=165 bgcolor=#d6d6d6
| 322165 ||  || — || May 22, 2003 || Kitt Peak || Spacewatch || EUP || align=right | 7.0 km || 
|-id=166 bgcolor=#E9E9E9
| 322166 ||  || — || September 28, 2006 || Mount Lemmon || Mount Lemmon Survey || — || align=right | 1.9 km || 
|-id=167 bgcolor=#C2FFFF
| 322167 ||  || — || November 3, 2010 || Mount Lemmon || Mount Lemmon Survey || L4 || align=right | 11 km || 
|-id=168 bgcolor=#E9E9E9
| 322168 ||  || — || December 10, 2006 || Kitt Peak || Spacewatch || — || align=right | 1.8 km || 
|-id=169 bgcolor=#fefefe
| 322169 ||  || — || July 11, 1994 || La Silla || E. W. Elst, H. Debehogne || — || align=right | 1.3 km || 
|-id=170 bgcolor=#E9E9E9
| 322170 ||  || — || February 7, 2007 || Kitt Peak || Spacewatch || — || align=right | 2.4 km || 
|-id=171 bgcolor=#C2FFFF
| 322171 ||  || — || February 12, 2002 || Kitt Peak || Spacewatch || L4 || align=right | 11 km || 
|-id=172 bgcolor=#d6d6d6
| 322172 ||  || — || January 19, 1996 || Kitt Peak || Spacewatch || TEL || align=right | 2.1 km || 
|-id=173 bgcolor=#d6d6d6
| 322173 ||  || — || April 3, 2008 || Mount Lemmon || Mount Lemmon Survey || — || align=right | 4.3 km || 
|-id=174 bgcolor=#d6d6d6
| 322174 ||  || — || November 1, 2005 || Mount Lemmon || Mount Lemmon Survey || — || align=right | 4.0 km || 
|-id=175 bgcolor=#E9E9E9
| 322175 ||  || — || August 31, 2005 || Kitt Peak || Spacewatch || HEN || align=right | 1.1 km || 
|-id=176 bgcolor=#E9E9E9
| 322176 ||  || — || August 31, 2005 || Kitt Peak || Spacewatch || HEN || align=right | 1.1 km || 
|-id=177 bgcolor=#d6d6d6
| 322177 ||  || — || May 4, 2002 || Kitt Peak || Spacewatch || — || align=right | 3.2 km || 
|-id=178 bgcolor=#d6d6d6
| 322178 ||  || — || December 24, 2005 || Kitt Peak || Spacewatch || — || align=right | 2.2 km || 
|-id=179 bgcolor=#d6d6d6
| 322179 ||  || — || November 25, 2005 || Mount Lemmon || Mount Lemmon Survey || URS || align=right | 3.6 km || 
|-id=180 bgcolor=#d6d6d6
| 322180 ||  || — || November 26, 2005 || Catalina || CSS || — || align=right | 3.6 km || 
|-id=181 bgcolor=#E9E9E9
| 322181 ||  || — || February 8, 1999 || Kitt Peak || Spacewatch || — || align=right | 2.3 km || 
|-id=182 bgcolor=#d6d6d6
| 322182 ||  || — || October 4, 2004 || Kitt Peak || Spacewatch || VER || align=right | 3.7 km || 
|-id=183 bgcolor=#d6d6d6
| 322183 ||  || — || October 18, 2009 || Catalina || CSS || EUP || align=right | 6.4 km || 
|-id=184 bgcolor=#E9E9E9
| 322184 ||  || — || November 28, 2006 || Kitt Peak || Spacewatch || — || align=right | 1.3 km || 
|-id=185 bgcolor=#d6d6d6
| 322185 ||  || — || October 27, 2005 || Kitt Peak || Spacewatch || K-2 || align=right | 1.6 km || 
|-id=186 bgcolor=#E9E9E9
| 322186 ||  || — || February 1, 2008 || Mount Lemmon || Mount Lemmon Survey || — || align=right | 2.1 km || 
|-id=187 bgcolor=#d6d6d6
| 322187 ||  || — || October 12, 1999 || Kitt Peak || Spacewatch || — || align=right | 3.7 km || 
|-id=188 bgcolor=#d6d6d6
| 322188 ||  || — || December 2, 2005 || Kitt Peak || Spacewatch || — || align=right | 2.6 km || 
|-id=189 bgcolor=#E9E9E9
| 322189 ||  || — || August 21, 2004 || Siding Spring || SSS || — || align=right | 3.1 km || 
|-id=190 bgcolor=#d6d6d6
| 322190 ||  || — || August 18, 2009 || Catalina || CSS || EUP || align=right | 7.2 km || 
|-id=191 bgcolor=#d6d6d6
| 322191 ||  || — || October 28, 2005 || Mount Lemmon || Mount Lemmon Survey || — || align=right | 3.7 km || 
|-id=192 bgcolor=#E9E9E9
| 322192 ||  || — || November 4, 2005 || Kitt Peak || Spacewatch || HOF || align=right | 2.6 km || 
|-id=193 bgcolor=#d6d6d6
| 322193 ||  || — || March 15, 2008 || Mount Lemmon || Mount Lemmon Survey || — || align=right | 4.5 km || 
|-id=194 bgcolor=#C2FFFF
| 322194 ||  || — || November 23, 2009 || Catalina || CSS || L4 || align=right | 9.6 km || 
|-id=195 bgcolor=#E9E9E9
| 322195 ||  || — || February 9, 2007 || Kitt Peak || Spacewatch || HOF || align=right | 2.8 km || 
|-id=196 bgcolor=#C2FFFF
| 322196 ||  || — || November 6, 2010 || Mount Lemmon || Mount Lemmon Survey || L4 || align=right | 12 km || 
|-id=197 bgcolor=#E9E9E9
| 322197 ||  || — || October 29, 2005 || Catalina || CSS || AGN || align=right | 1.5 km || 
|-id=198 bgcolor=#d6d6d6
| 322198 ||  || — || August 16, 2009 || Kitt Peak || Spacewatch || — || align=right | 3.0 km || 
|-id=199 bgcolor=#d6d6d6
| 322199 ||  || — || September 16, 2003 || Kitt Peak || Spacewatch || HYG || align=right | 3.7 km || 
|-id=200 bgcolor=#d6d6d6
| 322200 ||  || — || October 30, 2005 || Mount Lemmon || Mount Lemmon Survey || — || align=right | 4.5 km || 
|}

322201–322300 

|-bgcolor=#d6d6d6
| 322201 ||  || — || April 15, 2002 || Anderson Mesa || LONEOS || — || align=right | 4.1 km || 
|-id=202 bgcolor=#d6d6d6
| 322202 ||  || — || November 3, 2005 || Mount Lemmon || Mount Lemmon Survey || — || align=right | 3.5 km || 
|-id=203 bgcolor=#d6d6d6
| 322203 ||  || — || November 9, 2004 || Catalina || CSS || VER || align=right | 3.3 km || 
|-id=204 bgcolor=#E9E9E9
| 322204 ||  || — || December 2, 1996 || Kitt Peak || Spacewatch || AGN || align=right | 1.4 km || 
|-id=205 bgcolor=#d6d6d6
| 322205 ||  || — || October 15, 2004 || Mount Lemmon || Mount Lemmon Survey || — || align=right | 4.1 km || 
|-id=206 bgcolor=#d6d6d6
| 322206 ||  || — || January 24, 2006 || Anderson Mesa || LONEOS || — || align=right | 3.8 km || 
|-id=207 bgcolor=#d6d6d6
| 322207 ||  || — || January 23, 2006 || Mount Lemmon || Mount Lemmon Survey || — || align=right | 2.5 km || 
|-id=208 bgcolor=#d6d6d6
| 322208 ||  || — || November 8, 2009 || Mount Lemmon || Mount Lemmon Survey || SHU3:2 || align=right | 6.1 km || 
|-id=209 bgcolor=#fefefe
| 322209 ||  || — || September 5, 1994 || La Silla || E. W. Elst || — || align=right | 1.0 km || 
|-id=210 bgcolor=#d6d6d6
| 322210 ||  || — || February 2, 2006 || Kitt Peak || Spacewatch || EOS || align=right | 2.1 km || 
|-id=211 bgcolor=#fefefe
| 322211 ||  || — || November 11, 2006 || Kitt Peak || Spacewatch || NYS || align=right data-sort-value="0.71" | 710 m || 
|-id=212 bgcolor=#E9E9E9
| 322212 ||  || — || December 24, 2006 || Mount Lemmon || Mount Lemmon Survey || — || align=right | 2.1 km || 
|-id=213 bgcolor=#d6d6d6
| 322213 ||  || — || August 25, 2003 || Socorro || LINEAR || — || align=right | 3.0 km || 
|-id=214 bgcolor=#E9E9E9
| 322214 ||  || — || July 22, 1995 || Kitt Peak || Spacewatch || — || align=right | 2.6 km || 
|-id=215 bgcolor=#d6d6d6
| 322215 ||  || — || March 17, 2004 || Kitt Peak || Spacewatch || 3:2 || align=right | 4.2 km || 
|-id=216 bgcolor=#d6d6d6
| 322216 ||  || — || December 16, 2004 || Kitt Peak || Spacewatch || — || align=right | 3.4 km || 
|-id=217 bgcolor=#fefefe
| 322217 ||  || — || November 19, 2003 || Socorro || LINEAR || FLO || align=right data-sort-value="0.72" | 720 m || 
|-id=218 bgcolor=#d6d6d6
| 322218 ||  || — || January 28, 2006 || Kitt Peak || Spacewatch || — || align=right | 4.0 km || 
|-id=219 bgcolor=#d6d6d6
| 322219 ||  || — || October 21, 2003 || Kitt Peak || Spacewatch || — || align=right | 3.6 km || 
|-id=220 bgcolor=#E9E9E9
| 322220 ||  || — || February 10, 2002 || Socorro || LINEAR || — || align=right | 2.2 km || 
|-id=221 bgcolor=#d6d6d6
| 322221 ||  || — || February 1, 2006 || Mount Lemmon || Mount Lemmon Survey || — || align=right | 3.9 km || 
|-id=222 bgcolor=#d6d6d6
| 322222 ||  || — || December 5, 2005 || Kitt Peak || Spacewatch || — || align=right | 3.1 km || 
|-id=223 bgcolor=#E9E9E9
| 322223 ||  || — || March 20, 1999 || Apache Point || SDSS || — || align=right | 1.7 km || 
|-id=224 bgcolor=#d6d6d6
| 322224 ||  || — || December 21, 2005 || Kitt Peak || Spacewatch || — || align=right | 3.1 km || 
|-id=225 bgcolor=#E9E9E9
| 322225 ||  || — || October 7, 2005 || Kitt Peak || Spacewatch || — || align=right | 1.2 km || 
|-id=226 bgcolor=#E9E9E9
| 322226 ||  || — || September 5, 2000 || Kitt Peak || Spacewatch || MIS || align=right | 3.4 km || 
|-id=227 bgcolor=#d6d6d6
| 322227 ||  || — || November 29, 1997 || Kitt Peak || Spacewatch || HYG || align=right | 3.2 km || 
|-id=228 bgcolor=#d6d6d6
| 322228 ||  || — || September 28, 2003 || Kitt Peak || Spacewatch || — || align=right | 3.8 km || 
|-id=229 bgcolor=#fefefe
| 322229 ||  || — || February 29, 2004 || Kitt Peak || Spacewatch || — || align=right | 1.1 km || 
|-id=230 bgcolor=#fefefe
| 322230 ||  || — || April 14, 2004 || Kitt Peak || Spacewatch || V || align=right data-sort-value="0.90" | 900 m || 
|-id=231 bgcolor=#E9E9E9
| 322231 ||  || — || January 29, 1998 || Kitt Peak || Spacewatch || MIS || align=right | 2.7 km || 
|-id=232 bgcolor=#fefefe
| 322232 ||  || — || December 18, 1995 || Kitt Peak || Spacewatch || — || align=right data-sort-value="0.89" | 890 m || 
|-id=233 bgcolor=#d6d6d6
| 322233 ||  || — || September 27, 2003 || Apache Point || SDSS || — || align=right | 4.3 km || 
|-id=234 bgcolor=#E9E9E9
| 322234 ||  || — || October 15, 2001 || Kitt Peak || Spacewatch || — || align=right data-sort-value="0.90" | 900 m || 
|-id=235 bgcolor=#E9E9E9
| 322235 ||  || — || November 11, 1996 || Kitt Peak || Spacewatch || — || align=right | 2.3 km || 
|-id=236 bgcolor=#fefefe
| 322236 ||  || — || July 4, 2005 || Kitt Peak || Spacewatch || V || align=right data-sort-value="0.66" | 660 m || 
|-id=237 bgcolor=#fefefe
| 322237 ||  || — || April 5, 2000 || Anderson Mesa || LONEOS || MAS || align=right data-sort-value="0.96" | 960 m || 
|-id=238 bgcolor=#d6d6d6
| 322238 ||  || — || February 1, 1995 || Kitt Peak || Spacewatch || — || align=right | 3.1 km || 
|-id=239 bgcolor=#d6d6d6
| 322239 ||  || — || November 16, 2003 || Kitt Peak || Spacewatch || HYG || align=right | 3.6 km || 
|-id=240 bgcolor=#fefefe
| 322240 ||  || — || March 26, 2004 || Kitt Peak || Spacewatch || NYS || align=right data-sort-value="0.76" | 760 m || 
|-id=241 bgcolor=#d6d6d6
| 322241 ||  || — || November 10, 2004 || Kitt Peak || Spacewatch || KOR || align=right | 1.8 km || 
|-id=242 bgcolor=#fefefe
| 322242 ||  || — || March 26, 2001 || Kitt Peak || Spacewatch || — || align=right data-sort-value="0.93" | 930 m || 
|-id=243 bgcolor=#d6d6d6
| 322243 ||  || — || May 29, 2001 || Haleakala || NEAT || — || align=right | 4.8 km || 
|-id=244 bgcolor=#d6d6d6
| 322244 ||  || — || March 5, 2000 || Socorro || LINEAR || — || align=right | 5.1 km || 
|-id=245 bgcolor=#E9E9E9
| 322245 ||  || — || November 25, 2005 || Mount Lemmon || Mount Lemmon Survey || — || align=right | 3.0 km || 
|-id=246 bgcolor=#d6d6d6
| 322246 ||  || — || October 29, 2003 || Kitt Peak || Spacewatch || — || align=right | 3.4 km || 
|-id=247 bgcolor=#d6d6d6
| 322247 ||  || — || September 19, 2001 || Socorro || LINEAR || 7:4 || align=right | 6.2 km || 
|-id=248 bgcolor=#d6d6d6
| 322248 ||  || — || February 2, 2006 || Kitt Peak || Spacewatch || NAE || align=right | 3.5 km || 
|-id=249 bgcolor=#E9E9E9
| 322249 ||  || — || October 9, 2004 || Kitt Peak || Spacewatch || AGN || align=right | 1.6 km || 
|-id=250 bgcolor=#d6d6d6
| 322250 ||  || — || March 2, 2006 || Kitt Peak || Spacewatch || — || align=right | 3.0 km || 
|-id=251 bgcolor=#d6d6d6
| 322251 ||  || — || August 25, 1998 || Caussols || ODAS || — || align=right | 5.3 km || 
|-id=252 bgcolor=#E9E9E9
| 322252 ||  || — || March 15, 2007 || Mount Lemmon || Mount Lemmon Survey || — || align=right | 2.4 km || 
|-id=253 bgcolor=#fefefe
| 322253 ||  || — || March 3, 2000 || Apache Point || SDSS || MAS || align=right data-sort-value="0.95" | 950 m || 
|-id=254 bgcolor=#d6d6d6
| 322254 ||  || — || March 14, 2007 || Kitt Peak || Spacewatch || — || align=right | 2.4 km || 
|-id=255 bgcolor=#E9E9E9
| 322255 ||  || — || July 25, 1995 || Kitt Peak || Spacewatch || — || align=right | 1.7 km || 
|-id=256 bgcolor=#E9E9E9
| 322256 ||  || — || April 5, 2003 || Kitt Peak || Spacewatch || — || align=right | 1.2 km || 
|-id=257 bgcolor=#E9E9E9
| 322257 ||  || — || February 12, 2002 || Kitt Peak || Spacewatch || — || align=right | 3.0 km || 
|-id=258 bgcolor=#E9E9E9
| 322258 ||  || — || April 28, 2007 || Kitt Peak || Spacewatch || NEM || align=right | 2.7 km || 
|-id=259 bgcolor=#d6d6d6
| 322259 ||  || — || March 3, 2000 || Socorro || LINEAR || — || align=right | 4.5 km || 
|-id=260 bgcolor=#d6d6d6
| 322260 ||  || — || December 11, 1998 || Kitt Peak || Spacewatch || — || align=right | 5.0 km || 
|-id=261 bgcolor=#d6d6d6
| 322261 ||  || — || October 3, 2002 || Socorro || LINEAR || HYG || align=right | 3.8 km || 
|-id=262 bgcolor=#E9E9E9
| 322262 ||  || — || December 28, 2005 || Mount Lemmon || Mount Lemmon Survey || — || align=right | 1.5 km || 
|-id=263 bgcolor=#fefefe
| 322263 ||  || — || September 26, 2005 || Kitt Peak || Spacewatch || — || align=right | 1.2 km || 
|-id=264 bgcolor=#d6d6d6
| 322264 ||  || — || September 19, 2003 || Kitt Peak || Spacewatch || CRO || align=right | 3.8 km || 
|-id=265 bgcolor=#d6d6d6
| 322265 ||  || — || November 20, 2003 || Socorro || LINEAR || HYG || align=right | 4.0 km || 
|-id=266 bgcolor=#d6d6d6
| 322266 ||  || — || October 10, 1997 || Kitt Peak || Spacewatch || — || align=right | 6.3 km || 
|-id=267 bgcolor=#E9E9E9
| 322267 ||  || — || March 23, 1995 || Kitt Peak || Spacewatch || — || align=right data-sort-value="0.99" | 990 m || 
|-id=268 bgcolor=#d6d6d6
| 322268 ||  || — || February 27, 2006 || Kitt Peak || Spacewatch || — || align=right | 3.0 km || 
|-id=269 bgcolor=#d6d6d6
| 322269 ||  || — || March 5, 2006 || Mount Lemmon || Mount Lemmon Survey || KOR || align=right | 1.9 km || 
|-id=270 bgcolor=#E9E9E9
| 322270 ||  || — || December 30, 2005 || Kitt Peak || Spacewatch || HEN || align=right | 1.6 km || 
|-id=271 bgcolor=#d6d6d6
| 322271 ||  || — || October 9, 2008 || Kitt Peak || Spacewatch || — || align=right | 4.6 km || 
|-id=272 bgcolor=#d6d6d6
| 322272 ||  || — || June 18, 2002 || Palomar || NEAT || — || align=right | 4.4 km || 
|-id=273 bgcolor=#E9E9E9
| 322273 ||  || — || November 4, 2004 || Kitt Peak || Spacewatch || — || align=right | 2.3 km || 
|-id=274 bgcolor=#d6d6d6
| 322274 ||  || — || December 10, 2009 || Mount Lemmon || Mount Lemmon Survey || — || align=right | 2.9 km || 
|-id=275 bgcolor=#d6d6d6
| 322275 ||  || — || September 16, 2003 || Kitt Peak || Spacewatch || — || align=right | 2.6 km || 
|-id=276 bgcolor=#d6d6d6
| 322276 ||  || — || March 13, 1996 || Kitt Peak || Spacewatch || TRP || align=right | 3.8 km || 
|-id=277 bgcolor=#fefefe
| 322277 ||  || — || March 14, 2004 || Kitt Peak || Spacewatch || — || align=right data-sort-value="0.97" | 970 m || 
|-id=278 bgcolor=#fefefe
| 322278 ||  || — || March 17, 1996 || Kitt Peak || Spacewatch || — || align=right data-sort-value="0.85" | 850 m || 
|-id=279 bgcolor=#d6d6d6
| 322279 ||  || — || January 16, 2005 || Mauna Kea || C. Veillet || — || align=right | 3.0 km || 
|-id=280 bgcolor=#E9E9E9
| 322280 ||  || — || October 5, 2004 || Kitt Peak || Spacewatch || MIS || align=right | 3.0 km || 
|-id=281 bgcolor=#d6d6d6
| 322281 ||  || — || March 14, 2001 || Kitt Peak || Spacewatch || KOR || align=right | 2.0 km || 
|-id=282 bgcolor=#d6d6d6
| 322282 ||  || — || April 7, 2006 || Kitt Peak || Spacewatch || — || align=right | 3.4 km || 
|-id=283 bgcolor=#d6d6d6
| 322283 ||  || — || October 25, 2008 || Mount Lemmon || Mount Lemmon Survey || 7:4 || align=right | 3.8 km || 
|-id=284 bgcolor=#fefefe
| 322284 ||  || — || February 11, 2004 || Palomar || NEAT || FLO || align=right data-sort-value="0.75" | 750 m || 
|-id=285 bgcolor=#E9E9E9
| 322285 ||  || — || January 8, 2002 || Kitt Peak || Spacewatch || — || align=right | 1.6 km || 
|-id=286 bgcolor=#d6d6d6
| 322286 ||  || — || September 28, 2003 || Kitt Peak || Spacewatch || — || align=right | 2.7 km || 
|-id=287 bgcolor=#d6d6d6
| 322287 ||  || — || April 4, 2005 || Mount Lemmon || Mount Lemmon Survey || — || align=right | 3.4 km || 
|-id=288 bgcolor=#E9E9E9
| 322288 ||  || — || October 10, 1999 || Kitt Peak || Spacewatch || — || align=right | 2.5 km || 
|-id=289 bgcolor=#fefefe
| 322289 ||  || — || October 30, 2005 || Catalina || CSS || V || align=right data-sort-value="0.98" | 980 m || 
|-id=290 bgcolor=#E9E9E9
| 322290 ||  || — || September 4, 2008 || Kitt Peak || Spacewatch || PAD || align=right | 2.5 km || 
|-id=291 bgcolor=#d6d6d6
| 322291 ||  || — || March 12, 2000 || Kitt Peak || Spacewatch || — || align=right | 2.6 km || 
|-id=292 bgcolor=#d6d6d6
| 322292 ||  || — || September 4, 2007 || Catalina || CSS || EOS || align=right | 2.5 km || 
|-id=293 bgcolor=#d6d6d6
| 322293 ||  || — || November 30, 2003 || Kitt Peak || Spacewatch || — || align=right | 3.6 km || 
|-id=294 bgcolor=#E9E9E9
| 322294 ||  || — || January 19, 1996 || Kitt Peak || Spacewatch || AGN || align=right | 1.5 km || 
|-id=295 bgcolor=#E9E9E9
| 322295 ||  || — || October 28, 1995 || Kitt Peak || Spacewatch || — || align=right | 2.4 km || 
|-id=296 bgcolor=#E9E9E9
| 322296 ||  || — || October 12, 1999 || Kitt Peak || Spacewatch || AST || align=right | 1.9 km || 
|-id=297 bgcolor=#d6d6d6
| 322297 ||  || — || May 21, 2001 || Kitt Peak || Spacewatch || — || align=right | 4.8 km || 
|-id=298 bgcolor=#d6d6d6
| 322298 ||  || — || January 13, 2000 || Kitt Peak || Spacewatch || — || align=right | 4.3 km || 
|-id=299 bgcolor=#fefefe
| 322299 ||  || — || March 21, 2004 || Kitt Peak || Spacewatch || — || align=right | 1.1 km || 
|-id=300 bgcolor=#d6d6d6
| 322300 ||  || — || September 20, 2008 || Mount Lemmon || Mount Lemmon Survey || — || align=right | 2.5 km || 
|}

322301–322400 

|-bgcolor=#d6d6d6
| 322301 ||  || — || June 16, 2007 || Kitt Peak || Spacewatch || — || align=right | 2.7 km || 
|-id=302 bgcolor=#d6d6d6
| 322302 ||  || — || June 28, 2001 || Kitt Peak || Spacewatch || — || align=right | 3.4 km || 
|-id=303 bgcolor=#E9E9E9
| 322303 ||  || — || September 7, 2008 || Catalina || CSS || WIT || align=right | 1.4 km || 
|-id=304 bgcolor=#d6d6d6
| 322304 ||  || — || April 29, 2000 || Socorro || LINEAR || — || align=right | 3.2 km || 
|-id=305 bgcolor=#fefefe
| 322305 ||  || — || October 7, 1977 || Palomar || PLS || — || align=right data-sort-value="0.99" | 990 m || 
|-id=306 bgcolor=#E9E9E9
| 322306 ||  || — || October 7, 1999 || Kitt Peak || Spacewatch || HOF || align=right | 3.1 km || 
|-id=307 bgcolor=#d6d6d6
| 322307 ||  || — || October 8, 1999 || Kitt Peak || Spacewatch || CHA || align=right | 2.2 km || 
|-id=308 bgcolor=#E9E9E9
| 322308 ||  || — || March 15, 2007 || Mount Lemmon || Mount Lemmon Survey || — || align=right | 1.4 km || 
|-id=309 bgcolor=#E9E9E9
| 322309 ||  || — || October 15, 2004 || Mount Lemmon || Mount Lemmon Survey || WIT || align=right | 1.3 km || 
|-id=310 bgcolor=#fefefe
| 322310 ||  || — || August 9, 2004 || Anderson Mesa || LONEOS || NYS || align=right data-sort-value="0.97" | 970 m || 
|-id=311 bgcolor=#E9E9E9
| 322311 ||  || — || April 14, 2002 || Kitt Peak || Spacewatch || — || align=right | 3.6 km || 
|-id=312 bgcolor=#E9E9E9
| 322312 ||  || — || April 5, 2002 || Palomar || NEAT || — || align=right | 3.8 km || 
|-id=313 bgcolor=#E9E9E9
| 322313 ||  || — || October 2, 2000 || Kitt Peak || Spacewatch || — || align=right | 1.7 km || 
|-id=314 bgcolor=#E9E9E9
| 322314 ||  || — || October 4, 1999 || Kitt Peak || Spacewatch || — || align=right | 3.1 km || 
|-id=315 bgcolor=#E9E9E9
| 322315 ||  || — || December 19, 2009 || Kitt Peak || Spacewatch || — || align=right | 1.6 km || 
|-id=316 bgcolor=#C2FFFF
| 322316 || 2011 GG || — || January 27, 2010 || WISE || WISE || L4 || align=right | 12 km || 
|-id=317 bgcolor=#E9E9E9
| 322317 ||  || — || April 23, 2007 || Kitt Peak || Spacewatch || — || align=right | 1.2 km || 
|-id=318 bgcolor=#d6d6d6
| 322318 ||  || — || September 3, 2007 || Catalina || CSS || — || align=right | 2.9 km || 
|-id=319 bgcolor=#fefefe
| 322319 ||  || — || July 10, 2005 || Kitt Peak || Spacewatch || FLO || align=right data-sort-value="0.71" | 710 m || 
|-id=320 bgcolor=#d6d6d6
| 322320 ||  || — || October 29, 2002 || Kitt Peak || Spacewatch || VER || align=right | 5.2 km || 
|-id=321 bgcolor=#E9E9E9
| 322321 ||  || — || March 14, 2007 || Catalina || CSS || — || align=right | 1.4 km || 
|-id=322 bgcolor=#E9E9E9
| 322322 ||  || — || October 8, 2004 || Kitt Peak || Spacewatch || — || align=right | 1.4 km || 
|-id=323 bgcolor=#E9E9E9
| 322323 ||  || — || January 23, 2006 || Mount Lemmon || Mount Lemmon Survey || — || align=right | 1.7 km || 
|-id=324 bgcolor=#E9E9E9
| 322324 ||  || — || January 23, 2006 || Kitt Peak || Spacewatch || — || align=right | 2.5 km || 
|-id=325 bgcolor=#fefefe
| 322325 ||  || — || August 6, 2004 || Campo Imperatore || CINEOS || — || align=right | 1.1 km || 
|-id=326 bgcolor=#d6d6d6
| 322326 ||  || — || September 23, 2008 || Kitt Peak || Spacewatch || — || align=right | 4.1 km || 
|-id=327 bgcolor=#d6d6d6
| 322327 ||  || — || March 5, 2006 || Kitt Peak || Spacewatch || — || align=right | 2.3 km || 
|-id=328 bgcolor=#E9E9E9
| 322328 ||  || — || September 7, 1999 || Kitt Peak || Spacewatch || PAD || align=right | 1.7 km || 
|-id=329 bgcolor=#E9E9E9
| 322329 ||  || — || September 3, 1999 || Kitt Peak || Spacewatch || HEN || align=right | 1.3 km || 
|-id=330 bgcolor=#E9E9E9
| 322330 ||  || — || March 14, 2001 || Prescott || P. G. Comba || — || align=right | 3.1 km || 
|-id=331 bgcolor=#d6d6d6
| 322331 ||  || — || February 17, 2010 || Catalina || CSS || — || align=right | 4.5 km || 
|-id=332 bgcolor=#d6d6d6
| 322332 ||  || — || June 5, 1995 || Kitt Peak || Spacewatch || — || align=right | 4.7 km || 
|-id=333 bgcolor=#d6d6d6
| 322333 ||  || — || March 3, 2000 || Socorro || LINEAR || — || align=right | 3.7 km || 
|-id=334 bgcolor=#d6d6d6
| 322334 ||  || — || March 4, 2005 || Kitt Peak || Spacewatch || THM || align=right | 2.5 km || 
|-id=335 bgcolor=#E9E9E9
| 322335 ||  || — || November 10, 2004 || Kitt Peak || Spacewatch || MIS || align=right | 3.4 km || 
|-id=336 bgcolor=#d6d6d6
| 322336 ||  || — || March 11, 2005 || Anderson Mesa || LONEOS || — || align=right | 5.3 km || 
|-id=337 bgcolor=#d6d6d6
| 322337 ||  || — || November 24, 2003 || Kitt Peak || Spacewatch || EOS || align=right | 2.6 km || 
|-id=338 bgcolor=#d6d6d6
| 322338 ||  || — || April 24, 1995 || Kitt Peak || Spacewatch || — || align=right | 3.6 km || 
|-id=339 bgcolor=#d6d6d6
| 322339 ||  || — || December 19, 2003 || Kitt Peak || Spacewatch || — || align=right | 3.5 km || 
|-id=340 bgcolor=#fefefe
| 322340 ||  || — || January 24, 2007 || Mount Lemmon || Mount Lemmon Survey || — || align=right data-sort-value="0.78" | 780 m || 
|-id=341 bgcolor=#d6d6d6
| 322341 ||  || — || November 24, 2008 || Kitt Peak || Spacewatch || — || align=right | 4.2 km || 
|-id=342 bgcolor=#d6d6d6
| 322342 ||  || — || May 25, 2006 || Mount Lemmon || Mount Lemmon Survey || — || align=right | 2.6 km || 
|-id=343 bgcolor=#d6d6d6
| 322343 ||  || — || March 11, 2005 || Anderson Mesa || LONEOS || — || align=right | 4.8 km || 
|-id=344 bgcolor=#fefefe
| 322344 ||  || — || February 1, 1995 || Kitt Peak || Spacewatch || — || align=right | 1.3 km || 
|-id=345 bgcolor=#d6d6d6
| 322345 ||  || — || October 26, 2008 || Mount Lemmon || Mount Lemmon Survey || — || align=right | 3.6 km || 
|-id=346 bgcolor=#E9E9E9
| 322346 ||  || — || December 10, 2004 || Kitt Peak || Spacewatch || — || align=right | 3.0 km || 
|-id=347 bgcolor=#fefefe
| 322347 ||  || — || December 3, 2002 || Palomar || NEAT || V || align=right data-sort-value="0.79" | 790 m || 
|-id=348 bgcolor=#d6d6d6
| 322348 ||  || — || October 5, 2002 || Apache Point || SDSS || — || align=right | 3.3 km || 
|-id=349 bgcolor=#E9E9E9
| 322349 ||  || — || September 23, 2008 || Kitt Peak || Spacewatch || — || align=right | 1.1 km || 
|-id=350 bgcolor=#fefefe
| 322350 ||  || — || April 5, 2000 || Socorro || LINEAR || MAS || align=right data-sort-value="0.99" | 990 m || 
|-id=351 bgcolor=#d6d6d6
| 322351 ||  || — || April 1, 2005 || Kitt Peak || Spacewatch || — || align=right | 3.9 km || 
|-id=352 bgcolor=#d6d6d6
| 322352 ||  || — || February 9, 2005 || Mount Lemmon || Mount Lemmon Survey || KOR || align=right | 3.9 km || 
|-id=353 bgcolor=#E9E9E9
| 322353 ||  || — || July 3, 2003 || Kitt Peak || Spacewatch || — || align=right | 2.6 km || 
|-id=354 bgcolor=#d6d6d6
| 322354 ||  || — || October 13, 2007 || Catalina || CSS || — || align=right | 4.4 km || 
|-id=355 bgcolor=#fefefe
| 322355 ||  || — || June 20, 2004 || Kitt Peak || Spacewatch || NYS || align=right data-sort-value="0.82" | 820 m || 
|-id=356 bgcolor=#d6d6d6
| 322356 ||  || — || August 31, 2005 || Kitt Peak || Spacewatch || 3:2 || align=right | 5.3 km || 
|-id=357 bgcolor=#d6d6d6
| 322357 ||  || — || February 28, 2005 || Catalina || CSS || — || align=right | 6.1 km || 
|-id=358 bgcolor=#d6d6d6
| 322358 ||  || — || August 7, 2001 || Haleakala || NEAT || — || align=right | 5.2 km || 
|-id=359 bgcolor=#E9E9E9
| 322359 ||  || — || November 20, 1992 || Kitt Peak || Spacewatch || — || align=right | 1.3 km || 
|-id=360 bgcolor=#d6d6d6
| 322360 ||  || — || March 25, 2000 || Kitt Peak || Spacewatch || — || align=right | 3.0 km || 
|-id=361 bgcolor=#E9E9E9
| 322361 ||  || — || January 19, 2001 || Kitt Peak || Spacewatch || — || align=right | 2.3 km || 
|-id=362 bgcolor=#fefefe
| 322362 ||  || — || May 15, 2004 || Socorro || LINEAR || NYS || align=right data-sort-value="0.70" | 700 m || 
|-id=363 bgcolor=#E9E9E9
| 322363 ||  || — || February 7, 2002 || Kitt Peak || Spacewatch || — || align=right | 1.3 km || 
|-id=364 bgcolor=#d6d6d6
| 322364 ||  || — || October 21, 2007 || Mount Lemmon || Mount Lemmon Survey || — || align=right | 5.1 km || 
|-id=365 bgcolor=#d6d6d6
| 322365 ||  || — || January 28, 2000 || Kitt Peak || Spacewatch || CHA || align=right | 2.3 km || 
|-id=366 bgcolor=#d6d6d6
| 322366 ||  || — || October 27, 2008 || Mount Lemmon || Mount Lemmon Survey || EOS || align=right | 2.5 km || 
|-id=367 bgcolor=#d6d6d6
| 322367 ||  || — || January 16, 2005 || Kitt Peak || Spacewatch || — || align=right | 2.6 km || 
|-id=368 bgcolor=#fefefe
| 322368 ||  || — || April 28, 2007 || Kitt Peak || Spacewatch || — || align=right data-sort-value="0.94" | 940 m || 
|-id=369 bgcolor=#d6d6d6
| 322369 ||  || — || January 15, 1999 || Kitt Peak || Spacewatch || EOS || align=right | 2.8 km || 
|-id=370 bgcolor=#fefefe
| 322370 ||  || — || October 29, 2002 || Apache Point || SDSS || FLO || align=right data-sort-value="0.70" | 700 m || 
|-id=371 bgcolor=#E9E9E9
| 322371 ||  || — || September 18, 2003 || Kitt Peak || Spacewatch || — || align=right | 2.5 km || 
|-id=372 bgcolor=#d6d6d6
| 322372 ||  || — || February 14, 2010 || Kitt Peak || Spacewatch || KOR || align=right | 1.9 km || 
|-id=373 bgcolor=#d6d6d6
| 322373 ||  || — || September 12, 2001 || Socorro || LINEAR || — || align=right | 4.0 km || 
|-id=374 bgcolor=#E9E9E9
| 322374 ||  || — || September 19, 1998 || Apache Point || SDSS || AGN || align=right | 1.4 km || 
|-id=375 bgcolor=#E9E9E9
| 322375 ||  || — || October 29, 2003 || Kitt Peak || Spacewatch || AGN || align=right | 1.6 km || 
|-id=376 bgcolor=#d6d6d6
| 322376 ||  || — || April 25, 2000 || Anderson Mesa || LONEOS || — || align=right | 5.2 km || 
|-id=377 bgcolor=#E9E9E9
| 322377 ||  || — || November 26, 1995 || Kitt Peak || Spacewatch || HNS || align=right | 1.8 km || 
|-id=378 bgcolor=#C2FFFF
| 322378 ||  || — || March 5, 2006 || Junk Bond || D. Healy || L5 || align=right | 17 km || 
|-id=379 bgcolor=#C2FFFF
| 322379 ||  || — || December 9, 2002 || Kitt Peak || Spacewatch || L5 || align=right | 11 km || 
|-id=380 bgcolor=#fefefe
| 322380 ||  || — || July 21, 1996 || Haleakala || NEAT || MAS || align=right data-sort-value="0.95" | 950 m || 
|-id=381 bgcolor=#d6d6d6
| 322381 ||  || — || January 9, 2002 || Kitt Peak || Spacewatch || — || align=right | 4.4 km || 
|-id=382 bgcolor=#d6d6d6
| 322382 ||  || — || May 9, 2004 || Kitt Peak || Spacewatch || — || align=right | 4.5 km || 
|-id=383 bgcolor=#E9E9E9
| 322383 ||  || — || February 11, 2004 || Palomar || NEAT || AGN || align=right | 1.7 km || 
|-id=384 bgcolor=#E9E9E9
| 322384 ||  || — || September 28, 2002 || Palomar || NEAT || AGN || align=right | 1.5 km || 
|-id=385 bgcolor=#fefefe
| 322385 ||  || — || October 4, 2004 || Kitt Peak || Spacewatch || NYS || align=right data-sort-value="0.73" | 730 m || 
|-id=386 bgcolor=#d6d6d6
| 322386 ||  || — || December 17, 2001 || Socorro || LINEAR || — || align=right | 2.7 km || 
|-id=387 bgcolor=#E9E9E9
| 322387 ||  || — || October 29, 2002 || Apache Point || SDSS || PAD || align=right | 2.0 km || 
|-id=388 bgcolor=#fefefe
| 322388 ||  || — || April 9, 2003 || Kitt Peak || Spacewatch || MAS || align=right data-sort-value="0.90" | 900 m || 
|-id=389 bgcolor=#E9E9E9
| 322389 ||  || — || January 27, 2004 || Kitt Peak || Spacewatch || — || align=right | 2.7 km || 
|-id=390 bgcolor=#d6d6d6
| 322390 Planes de Son ||  ||  || June 9, 2004 || Kitt Peak || Spacewatch || — || align=right | 3.8 km || 
|-id=391 bgcolor=#fefefe
| 322391 ||  || — || October 13, 2004 || Kitt Peak || Spacewatch || — || align=right | 1.2 km || 
|-id=392 bgcolor=#d6d6d6
| 322392 ||  || — || November 20, 2001 || Socorro || LINEAR || — || align=right | 4.5 km || 
|-id=393 bgcolor=#E9E9E9
| 322393 ||  || — || September 14, 2007 || Mount Lemmon || Mount Lemmon Survey || HEN || align=right data-sort-value="0.94" | 940 m || 
|-id=394 bgcolor=#d6d6d6
| 322394 ||  || — || December 6, 2007 || Mount Lemmon || Mount Lemmon Survey || KAR || align=right | 1.3 km || 
|-id=395 bgcolor=#d6d6d6
| 322395 ||  || — || May 2, 2005 || Kitt Peak || Spacewatch || — || align=right | 2.3 km || 
|-id=396 bgcolor=#d6d6d6
| 322396 ||  || — || May 3, 2005 || Kitt Peak || Spacewatch || KOR || align=right | 1.6 km || 
|-id=397 bgcolor=#d6d6d6
| 322397 ||  || — || June 19, 2006 || Mount Lemmon || Mount Lemmon Survey || KOR || align=right | 2.0 km || 
|-id=398 bgcolor=#E9E9E9
| 322398 ||  || — || October 10, 1999 || Kitt Peak || Spacewatch || — || align=right | 1.1 km || 
|-id=399 bgcolor=#d6d6d6
| 322399 ||  || — || September 25, 2006 || Catalina || CSS || — || align=right | 5.0 km || 
|-id=400 bgcolor=#fefefe
| 322400 ||  || — || May 12, 2007 || Mount Lemmon || Mount Lemmon Survey || — || align=right data-sort-value="0.77" | 770 m || 
|}

322401–322500 

|-bgcolor=#E9E9E9
| 322401 ||  || — || April 24, 2000 || Kitt Peak || Spacewatch || POS || align=right | 4.7 km || 
|-id=402 bgcolor=#fefefe
| 322402 ||  || — || October 6, 2008 || Kitt Peak || Spacewatch || — || align=right data-sort-value="0.68" | 680 m || 
|-id=403 bgcolor=#d6d6d6
| 322403 ||  || — || June 5, 2005 || Kitt Peak || Spacewatch || HYG || align=right | 3.3 km || 
|-id=404 bgcolor=#d6d6d6
| 322404 ||  || — || April 27, 2009 || Mount Lemmon || Mount Lemmon Survey || — || align=right | 3.9 km || 
|-id=405 bgcolor=#d6d6d6
| 322405 ||  || — || December 13, 2002 || Palomar || NEAT || KOR || align=right | 1.3 km || 
|-id=406 bgcolor=#E9E9E9
| 322406 ||  || — || February 4, 2000 || Kitt Peak || Spacewatch || — || align=right | 2.8 km || 
|-id=407 bgcolor=#d6d6d6
| 322407 ||  || — || November 15, 2006 || Kitt Peak || Spacewatch || — || align=right | 2.7 km || 
|-id=408 bgcolor=#d6d6d6
| 322408 ||  || — || February 8, 2008 || Mount Lemmon || Mount Lemmon Survey || — || align=right | 3.2 km || 
|-id=409 bgcolor=#d6d6d6
| 322409 ||  || — || July 29, 2005 || Palomar || NEAT || EMA || align=right | 4.1 km || 
|-id=410 bgcolor=#fefefe
| 322410 ||  || — || April 2, 2006 || Kitt Peak || Spacewatch || — || align=right | 1.1 km || 
|-id=411 bgcolor=#E9E9E9
| 322411 ||  || — || September 16, 2006 || Kitt Peak || Spacewatch || — || align=right | 2.9 km || 
|-id=412 bgcolor=#fefefe
| 322412 ||  || — || May 3, 2006 || Mount Lemmon || Mount Lemmon Survey || — || align=right | 1.3 km || 
|-id=413 bgcolor=#E9E9E9
| 322413 ||  || — || August 28, 2006 || Catalina || CSS || — || align=right | 2.3 km || 
|-id=414 bgcolor=#d6d6d6
| 322414 ||  || — || September 7, 2000 || Kitt Peak || Spacewatch || — || align=right | 3.6 km || 
|-id=415 bgcolor=#E9E9E9
| 322415 ||  || — || August 28, 2006 || Kitt Peak || Spacewatch || — || align=right | 2.3 km || 
|-id=416 bgcolor=#E9E9E9
| 322416 ||  || — || February 8, 1995 || Kitt Peak || Spacewatch || HEN || align=right | 1.6 km || 
|-id=417 bgcolor=#fefefe
| 322417 ||  || — || October 11, 1996 || Haleakala || NEAT || NYS || align=right data-sort-value="0.76" | 760 m || 
|-id=418 bgcolor=#E9E9E9
| 322418 ||  || — || April 9, 2005 || Mount Lemmon || Mount Lemmon Survey || — || align=right | 3.0 km || 
|-id=419 bgcolor=#fefefe
| 322419 ||  || — || November 4, 2004 || Catalina || CSS || — || align=right data-sort-value="0.92" | 920 m || 
|-id=420 bgcolor=#fefefe
| 322420 ||  || — || March 19, 1999 || Kitt Peak || Spacewatch || MAS || align=right | 1.0 km || 
|-id=421 bgcolor=#d6d6d6
| 322421 ||  || — || March 27, 2009 || Kitt Peak || Spacewatch || — || align=right | 5.1 km || 
|-id=422 bgcolor=#E9E9E9
| 322422 ||  || — || April 18, 2001 || Kitt Peak || Spacewatch || — || align=right | 1.6 km || 
|-id=423 bgcolor=#fefefe
| 322423 ||  || — || August 9, 2007 || Kitt Peak || Spacewatch || — || align=right data-sort-value="0.96" | 960 m || 
|-id=424 bgcolor=#E9E9E9
| 322424 ||  || — || March 10, 2005 || Mount Lemmon || Mount Lemmon Survey || NEM || align=right | 2.7 km || 
|-id=425 bgcolor=#fefefe
| 322425 ||  || — || November 20, 2004 || Kitt Peak || Spacewatch || — || align=right data-sort-value="0.94" | 940 m || 
|-id=426 bgcolor=#E9E9E9
| 322426 ||  || — || March 14, 2000 || Kitt Peak || Spacewatch || — || align=right | 2.5 km || 
|-id=427 bgcolor=#fefefe
| 322427 ||  || — || October 8, 2004 || Kitt Peak || Spacewatch || — || align=right | 1.1 km || 
|-id=428 bgcolor=#d6d6d6
| 322428 ||  || — || February 17, 2004 || Kitt Peak || Spacewatch || KOR || align=right | 1.5 km || 
|-id=429 bgcolor=#E9E9E9
| 322429 ||  || — || November 5, 2007 || Kitt Peak || Spacewatch || — || align=right | 2.2 km || 
|-id=430 bgcolor=#E9E9E9
| 322430 ||  || — || May 8, 2006 || Mount Lemmon || Mount Lemmon Survey || — || align=right | 3.2 km || 
|-id=431 bgcolor=#d6d6d6
| 322431 ||  || — || November 18, 2001 || Apache Point || SDSS || 628 || align=right | 2.1 km || 
|-id=432 bgcolor=#fefefe
| 322432 ||  || — || March 20, 2002 || Kitt Peak || Spacewatch || V || align=right data-sort-value="0.81" | 810 m || 
|-id=433 bgcolor=#fefefe
| 322433 ||  || — || July 7, 2007 || Reedy Creek || J. Broughton || NYS || align=right data-sort-value="0.86" | 860 m || 
|-id=434 bgcolor=#E9E9E9
| 322434 ||  || — || April 9, 2005 || Kitt Peak || Spacewatch || — || align=right | 2.5 km || 
|-id=435 bgcolor=#fefefe
| 322435 ||  || — || January 14, 2002 || Socorro || LINEAR || — || align=right | 1.3 km || 
|-id=436 bgcolor=#d6d6d6
| 322436 ||  || — || August 24, 2005 || Palomar || NEAT || — || align=right | 3.4 km || 
|-id=437 bgcolor=#d6d6d6
| 322437 ||  || — || September 25, 2005 || Kitt Peak || Spacewatch || HYG || align=right | 3.6 km || 
|-id=438 bgcolor=#E9E9E9
| 322438 ||  || — || November 17, 2007 || Mount Lemmon || Mount Lemmon Survey || — || align=right | 1.1 km || 
|-id=439 bgcolor=#d6d6d6
| 322439 ||  || — || January 11, 2003 || Kitt Peak || Spacewatch || — || align=right | 2.0 km || 
|-id=440 bgcolor=#E9E9E9
| 322440 ||  || — || August 23, 2006 || Palomar || NEAT || XIZ || align=right | 3.3 km || 
|-id=441 bgcolor=#E9E9E9
| 322441 ||  || — || December 24, 1998 || Kitt Peak || Spacewatch || AST || align=right | 3.4 km || 
|-id=442 bgcolor=#d6d6d6
| 322442 ||  || — || September 19, 1995 || Kitt Peak || Spacewatch || — || align=right | 5.1 km || 
|-id=443 bgcolor=#fefefe
| 322443 ||  || — || April 7, 1999 || Kitt Peak || Spacewatch || NYS || align=right data-sort-value="0.84" | 840 m || 
|-id=444 bgcolor=#E9E9E9
| 322444 ||  || — || October 16, 2003 || Palomar || NEAT || — || align=right | 1.7 km || 
|-id=445 bgcolor=#d6d6d6
| 322445 ||  || — || July 5, 2005 || Mount Lemmon || Mount Lemmon Survey || — || align=right | 2.7 km || 
|-id=446 bgcolor=#E9E9E9
| 322446 ||  || — || August 28, 2002 || Palomar || R. Matson || — || align=right | 1.7 km || 
|-id=447 bgcolor=#E9E9E9
| 322447 ||  || — || September 28, 2006 || Mount Lemmon || Mount Lemmon Survey || — || align=right | 2.3 km || 
|-id=448 bgcolor=#d6d6d6
| 322448 ||  || — || January 16, 2008 || Mount Lemmon || Mount Lemmon Survey || — || align=right | 5.6 km || 
|-id=449 bgcolor=#fefefe
| 322449 ||  || — || September 24, 2000 || Socorro || LINEAR || — || align=right | 1.1 km || 
|-id=450 bgcolor=#d6d6d6
| 322450 ||  || — || January 17, 2007 || Kitt Peak || Spacewatch || 7:4 || align=right | 3.6 km || 
|-id=451 bgcolor=#fefefe
| 322451 ||  || — || January 9, 2006 || Mount Lemmon || Mount Lemmon Survey || V || align=right data-sort-value="0.96" | 960 m || 
|-id=452 bgcolor=#E9E9E9
| 322452 ||  || — || November 5, 2007 || Mount Lemmon || Mount Lemmon Survey || — || align=right | 2.9 km || 
|-id=453 bgcolor=#fefefe
| 322453 ||  || — || January 21, 2002 || Palomar || NEAT || — || align=right | 1.2 km || 
|-id=454 bgcolor=#d6d6d6
| 322454 ||  || — || October 27, 2006 || Mount Lemmon || Mount Lemmon Survey || — || align=right | 5.1 km || 
|-id=455 bgcolor=#fefefe
| 322455 ||  || — || February 14, 2001 || Kleť || Kleť Obs. || MAS || align=right data-sort-value="0.81" | 810 m || 
|-id=456 bgcolor=#d6d6d6
| 322456 ||  || — || March 23, 2003 || Kitt Peak || Spacewatch || — || align=right | 2.9 km || 
|-id=457 bgcolor=#d6d6d6
| 322457 ||  || — || October 9, 2005 || Kitt Peak || Spacewatch || — || align=right | 2.9 km || 
|-id=458 bgcolor=#d6d6d6
| 322458 ||  || — || September 27, 2005 || Kitt Peak || Spacewatch || EOS || align=right | 2.1 km || 
|-id=459 bgcolor=#d6d6d6
| 322459 ||  || — || October 23, 1995 || Kitt Peak || Spacewatch || EOS || align=right | 2.4 km || 
|-id=460 bgcolor=#E9E9E9
| 322460 ||  || — || March 29, 2000 || Kitt Peak || Spacewatch || HEN || align=right | 1.3 km || 
|-id=461 bgcolor=#E9E9E9
| 322461 ||  || — || February 11, 2004 || Kitt Peak || Spacewatch || — || align=right | 1.9 km || 
|-id=462 bgcolor=#E9E9E9
| 322462 ||  || — || March 10, 2005 || Mount Lemmon || Mount Lemmon Survey || — || align=right | 1.7 km || 
|-id=463 bgcolor=#E9E9E9
| 322463 ||  || — || March 11, 2005 || Mount Lemmon || Mount Lemmon Survey || — || align=right | 1.3 km || 
|-id=464 bgcolor=#d6d6d6
| 322464 ||  || — || July 28, 2005 || Palomar || NEAT || — || align=right | 3.3 km || 
|-id=465 bgcolor=#d6d6d6
| 322465 ||  || — || September 27, 2005 || Kitt Peak || Spacewatch || — || align=right | 3.1 km || 
|-id=466 bgcolor=#d6d6d6
| 322466 ||  || — || November 17, 2006 || Kitt Peak || Spacewatch || — || align=right | 3.9 km || 
|-id=467 bgcolor=#d6d6d6
| 322467 ||  || — || November 25, 2005 || Catalina || CSS || SYL7:4 || align=right | 3.9 km || 
|-id=468 bgcolor=#E9E9E9
| 322468 ||  || — || June 23, 2005 || Palomar || NEAT || — || align=right | 3.9 km || 
|-id=469 bgcolor=#fefefe
| 322469 ||  || — || September 7, 2000 || Kitt Peak || Spacewatch || FLO || align=right data-sort-value="0.99" | 990 m || 
|-id=470 bgcolor=#E9E9E9
| 322470 ||  || — || June 21, 2010 || Mount Lemmon || Mount Lemmon Survey || XIZ || align=right | 1.6 km || 
|-id=471 bgcolor=#d6d6d6
| 322471 ||  || — || March 11, 2003 || Palomar || NEAT || — || align=right | 3.9 km || 
|-id=472 bgcolor=#d6d6d6
| 322472 ||  || — || November 18, 2006 || Kitt Peak || Spacewatch || — || align=right | 4.0 km || 
|-id=473 bgcolor=#E9E9E9
| 322473 ||  || — || October 17, 2003 || Kitt Peak || Spacewatch || — || align=right | 1.5 km || 
|-id=474 bgcolor=#d6d6d6
| 322474 ||  || — || September 25, 1995 || Kitt Peak || Spacewatch || — || align=right | 2.5 km || 
|-id=475 bgcolor=#d6d6d6
| 322475 ||  || — || August 31, 2005 || Anderson Mesa || LONEOS || — || align=right | 4.2 km || 
|-id=476 bgcolor=#E9E9E9
| 322476 ||  || — || October 2, 2006 || Kitt Peak || Spacewatch || HOF || align=right | 2.4 km || 
|-id=477 bgcolor=#fefefe
| 322477 ||  || — || May 2, 2003 || Kitt Peak || Spacewatch || — || align=right | 1.5 km || 
|-id=478 bgcolor=#fefefe
| 322478 ||  || — || January 8, 2002 || Socorro || LINEAR || NYS || align=right | 2.9 km || 
|-id=479 bgcolor=#fefefe
| 322479 ||  || — || November 18, 1998 || Kitt Peak || Spacewatch || FLO || align=right data-sort-value="0.73" | 730 m || 
|-id=480 bgcolor=#E9E9E9
| 322480 ||  || — || January 29, 2009 || Mount Lemmon || Mount Lemmon Survey || — || align=right | 1.4 km || 
|-id=481 bgcolor=#d6d6d6
| 322481 ||  || — || August 30, 2005 || Kitt Peak || Spacewatch || — || align=right | 2.7 km || 
|-id=482 bgcolor=#E9E9E9
| 322482 ||  || — || November 13, 2002 || Palomar || NEAT || PAD || align=right | 3.4 km || 
|-id=483 bgcolor=#d6d6d6
| 322483 ||  || — || October 9, 1999 || Kitt Peak || Spacewatch || — || align=right | 3.2 km || 
|-id=484 bgcolor=#E9E9E9
| 322484 ||  || — || May 6, 2005 || Catalina || CSS || — || align=right | 1.5 km || 
|-id=485 bgcolor=#E9E9E9
| 322485 ||  || — || September 2, 1998 || Kitt Peak || Spacewatch || — || align=right | 1.5 km || 
|-id=486 bgcolor=#fefefe
| 322486 ||  || — || December 1, 2008 || Mount Lemmon || Mount Lemmon Survey || — || align=right | 1.1 km || 
|-id=487 bgcolor=#fefefe
| 322487 ||  || — || September 3, 2000 || Kitt Peak || Spacewatch || NYS || align=right data-sort-value="0.79" | 790 m || 
|-id=488 bgcolor=#fefefe
| 322488 ||  || — || December 3, 2004 || Kitt Peak || Spacewatch || V || align=right data-sort-value="0.88" | 880 m || 
|-id=489 bgcolor=#d6d6d6
| 322489 ||  || — || October 7, 2000 || Anderson Mesa || LONEOS || — || align=right | 3.5 km || 
|-id=490 bgcolor=#d6d6d6
| 322490 ||  || — || October 23, 2006 || Mount Lemmon || Mount Lemmon Survey || — || align=right | 2.9 km || 
|-id=491 bgcolor=#E9E9E9
| 322491 ||  || — || August 20, 2001 || Cerro Tololo || M. W. Buie || AST || align=right | 2.0 km || 
|-id=492 bgcolor=#E9E9E9
| 322492 ||  || — || November 18, 2007 || Kitt Peak || Spacewatch || — || align=right | 1.6 km || 
|-id=493 bgcolor=#d6d6d6
| 322493 ||  || — || June 11, 2004 || Kitt Peak || Spacewatch || — || align=right | 4.2 km || 
|-id=494 bgcolor=#E9E9E9
| 322494 ||  || — || December 5, 2003 || Socorro || LINEAR || — || align=right | 3.2 km || 
|-id=495 bgcolor=#fefefe
| 322495 ||  || — || January 17, 2005 || Kitt Peak || Spacewatch || — || align=right | 1.3 km || 
|-id=496 bgcolor=#fefefe
| 322496 ||  || — || May 21, 2006 || Kitt Peak || Spacewatch || — || align=right | 1.4 km || 
|-id=497 bgcolor=#d6d6d6
| 322497 ||  || — || February 28, 2008 || Mount Lemmon || Mount Lemmon Survey || — || align=right | 2.9 km || 
|-id=498 bgcolor=#E9E9E9
| 322498 ||  || — || March 16, 2005 || Catalina || CSS || — || align=right | 2.3 km || 
|-id=499 bgcolor=#d6d6d6
| 322499 ||  || — || February 12, 2008 || Mount Lemmon || Mount Lemmon Survey || — || align=right | 3.3 km || 
|-id=500 bgcolor=#d6d6d6
| 322500 ||  || — || November 20, 2001 || Socorro || LINEAR || — || align=right | 3.1 km || 
|}

322501–322600 

|-bgcolor=#d6d6d6
| 322501 ||  || — || February 13, 2008 || Catalina || CSS || — || align=right | 4.2 km || 
|-id=502 bgcolor=#E9E9E9
| 322502 ||  || — || September 14, 2006 || Catalina || CSS || — || align=right | 2.9 km || 
|-id=503 bgcolor=#E9E9E9
| 322503 ||  || — || November 7, 2007 || Kitt Peak || Spacewatch || — || align=right data-sort-value="0.83" | 830 m || 
|-id=504 bgcolor=#d6d6d6
| 322504 ||  || — || November 19, 1995 || Haleakala || AMOS || — || align=right | 4.1 km || 
|-id=505 bgcolor=#E9E9E9
| 322505 ||  || — || April 12, 2004 || Kitt Peak || Spacewatch || GEF || align=right | 1.5 km || 
|-id=506 bgcolor=#E9E9E9
| 322506 ||  || — || November 12, 2007 || Mount Lemmon || Mount Lemmon Survey || — || align=right | 1.6 km || 
|-id=507 bgcolor=#d6d6d6
| 322507 ||  || — || April 4, 2008 || Catalina || CSS || — || align=right | 4.7 km || 
|-id=508 bgcolor=#E9E9E9
| 322508 ||  || — || September 15, 2006 || Kitt Peak || Spacewatch || — || align=right | 1.4 km || 
|-id=509 bgcolor=#E9E9E9
| 322509 ||  || — || September 14, 2002 || Palomar || NEAT || — || align=right | 1.6 km || 
|-id=510 bgcolor=#E9E9E9
| 322510 Heinrichgrüber ||  ||  || October 10, 1990 || Tautenburg Observatory || F. Börngen, L. D. Schmadel || — || align=right | 1.4 km || 
|-id=511 bgcolor=#E9E9E9
| 322511 ||  || — || October 16, 2006 || Catalina || CSS || — || align=right | 3.2 km || 
|-id=512 bgcolor=#fefefe
| 322512 ||  || — || April 4, 1998 || Kitt Peak || Spacewatch || NYS || align=right data-sort-value="0.89" | 890 m || 
|-id=513 bgcolor=#d6d6d6
| 322513 ||  || — || November 4, 2005 || Mount Lemmon || Mount Lemmon Survey || — || align=right | 2.9 km || 
|-id=514 bgcolor=#E9E9E9
| 322514 ||  || — || September 24, 2006 || Anderson Mesa || LONEOS || — || align=right | 3.8 km || 
|-id=515 bgcolor=#d6d6d6
| 322515 ||  || — || November 11, 2006 || Kitt Peak || Spacewatch || — || align=right | 4.0 km || 
|-id=516 bgcolor=#fefefe
| 322516 ||  || — || December 4, 2008 || Socorro || LINEAR || H || align=right data-sort-value="0.95" | 950 m || 
|-id=517 bgcolor=#fefefe
| 322517 ||  || — || September 26, 2000 || Apache Point || SDSS || — || align=right | 1.00 km || 
|-id=518 bgcolor=#d6d6d6
| 322518 ||  || — || December 30, 2000 || Socorro || LINEAR || URS || align=right | 5.0 km || 
|-id=519 bgcolor=#C2FFFF
| 322519 ||  || — || June 17, 2006 || Kitt Peak || Spacewatch || L4 || align=right | 12 km || 
|-id=520 bgcolor=#C2FFFF
| 322520 ||  || — || October 26, 2009 || Mount Lemmon || Mount Lemmon Survey || L4 || align=right | 10 km || 
|-id=521 bgcolor=#d6d6d6
| 322521 ||  || — || December 5, 2005 || Kitt Peak || Spacewatch || MEL || align=right | 4.4 km || 
|-id=522 bgcolor=#E9E9E9
| 322522 ||  || — || December 31, 2002 || Socorro || LINEAR || — || align=right | 3.4 km || 
|-id=523 bgcolor=#E9E9E9
| 322523 ||  || — || September 18, 2001 || Anderson Mesa || LONEOS || — || align=right | 3.5 km || 
|-id=524 bgcolor=#C2FFFF
| 322524 ||  || — || March 18, 2004 || Kitt Peak || Spacewatch || L4 || align=right | 13 km || 
|-id=525 bgcolor=#C2FFFF
| 322525 ||  || — || September 28, 2008 || Catalina || CSS || L4 || align=right | 11 km || 
|-id=526 bgcolor=#E9E9E9
| 322526 ||  || — || November 27, 2011 || Mount Lemmon || Mount Lemmon Survey || JUN || align=right | 1.1 km || 
|-id=527 bgcolor=#E9E9E9
| 322527 ||  || — || September 18, 2006 || Catalina || CSS || — || align=right | 1.2 km || 
|-id=528 bgcolor=#fefefe
| 322528 ||  || — || September 19, 1995 || Kitt Peak || Spacewatch || MAS || align=right data-sort-value="0.74" | 740 m || 
|-id=529 bgcolor=#d6d6d6
| 322529 ||  || — || October 22, 2005 || Kitt Peak || Spacewatch || — || align=right | 2.6 km || 
|-id=530 bgcolor=#fefefe
| 322530 ||  || — || September 17, 1995 || Kitt Peak || Spacewatch || EUT || align=right data-sort-value="0.79" | 790 m || 
|-id=531 bgcolor=#fefefe
| 322531 ||  || — || March 12, 2002 || Kitt Peak || Spacewatch || — || align=right data-sort-value="0.69" | 690 m || 
|-id=532 bgcolor=#E9E9E9
| 322532 ||  || — || March 31, 2004 || Siding Spring || R. H. McNaught || — || align=right | 1.2 km || 
|-id=533 bgcolor=#E9E9E9
| 322533 ||  || — || July 6, 2005 || Kitt Peak || Spacewatch || — || align=right | 1.1 km || 
|-id=534 bgcolor=#fefefe
| 322534 ||  || — || October 21, 1995 || Kitt Peak || Spacewatch || — || align=right | 1.1 km || 
|-id=535 bgcolor=#fefefe
| 322535 ||  || — || January 7, 2005 || Kitt Peak || Spacewatch || NYS || align=right data-sort-value="0.61" | 610 m || 
|-id=536 bgcolor=#d6d6d6
| 322536 ||  || — || April 12, 2002 || Palomar || NEAT || EOS || align=right | 3.0 km || 
|-id=537 bgcolor=#E9E9E9
| 322537 ||  || — || April 14, 2004 || Kitt Peak || Spacewatch || — || align=right | 3.0 km || 
|-id=538 bgcolor=#C2FFFF
| 322538 ||  || — || May 20, 2004 || Kitt Peak || Spacewatch || L4 || align=right | 11 km || 
|-id=539 bgcolor=#E9E9E9
| 322539 ||  || — || September 25, 2006 || Moletai || Molėtai Obs. || — || align=right | 1.4 km || 
|-id=540 bgcolor=#C2FFFF
| 322540 ||  || — || September 15, 2007 || Pla D'Arguines || R. Ferrando || L4ERY || align=right | 11 km || 
|-id=541 bgcolor=#E9E9E9
| 322541 ||  || — || August 6, 2005 || Palomar || NEAT || HEN || align=right | 1.4 km || 
|-id=542 bgcolor=#E9E9E9
| 322542 ||  || — || September 30, 2006 || Socorro || LINEAR || — || align=right | 1.1 km || 
|-id=543 bgcolor=#d6d6d6
| 322543 ||  || — || November 27, 2006 || Mount Lemmon || Mount Lemmon Survey || — || align=right | 4.3 km || 
|-id=544 bgcolor=#E9E9E9
| 322544 ||  || — || August 28, 2005 || Kitt Peak || Spacewatch || — || align=right | 2.5 km || 
|-id=545 bgcolor=#E9E9E9
| 322545 ||  || — || November 25, 2006 || Kitt Peak || Spacewatch || PAD || align=right | 2.0 km || 
|-id=546 bgcolor=#C2FFFF
| 322546 ||  || — || September 17, 2009 || Mount Lemmon || Mount Lemmon Survey || L4 || align=right | 7.0 km || 
|-id=547 bgcolor=#d6d6d6
| 322547 ||  || — || February 22, 2007 || Kitt Peak || Spacewatch || — || align=right | 3.3 km || 
|-id=548 bgcolor=#fefefe
| 322548 ||  || — || January 10, 1997 || Kitt Peak || Spacewatch || NYS || align=right data-sort-value="0.71" | 710 m || 
|-id=549 bgcolor=#fefefe
| 322549 ||  || — || June 21, 2010 || Mount Lemmon || Mount Lemmon Survey || — || align=right | 1.3 km || 
|-id=550 bgcolor=#C2FFFF
| 322550 ||  || — || October 10, 2008 || Mount Lemmon || Mount Lemmon Survey || L4 || align=right | 8.0 km || 
|-id=551 bgcolor=#d6d6d6
| 322551 ||  || — || September 11, 2004 || Kitt Peak || Spacewatch || — || align=right | 3.6 km || 
|-id=552 bgcolor=#d6d6d6
| 322552 ||  || — || March 31, 2003 || Kitt Peak || Spacewatch || EOS || align=right | 2.3 km || 
|-id=553 bgcolor=#C2FFFF
| 322553 ||  || — || October 3, 2008 || Mount Lemmon || Mount Lemmon Survey || L4 || align=right | 11 km || 
|-id=554 bgcolor=#d6d6d6
| 322554 ||  || — || January 22, 2006 || Socorro || LINEAR || THB || align=right | 4.0 km || 
|-id=555 bgcolor=#C2FFFF
| 322555 ||  || — || September 19, 2007 || Kitt Peak || Spacewatch || L4ERY || align=right | 8.0 km || 
|-id=556 bgcolor=#E9E9E9
| 322556 ||  || — || November 7, 2007 || Mount Lemmon || Mount Lemmon Survey || — || align=right | 2.1 km || 
|-id=557 bgcolor=#d6d6d6
| 322557 ||  || — || October 13, 1999 || Apache Point || SDSS || EUP || align=right | 5.3 km || 
|-id=558 bgcolor=#d6d6d6
| 322558 ||  || — || June 22, 2004 || Kitt Peak || Spacewatch || — || align=right | 3.7 km || 
|-id=559 bgcolor=#d6d6d6
| 322559 ||  || — || May 9, 1996 || Kitt Peak || Spacewatch || HYG || align=right | 3.7 km || 
|-id=560 bgcolor=#C2FFFF
| 322560 ||  || — || January 16, 2010 || WISE || WISE || L4 || align=right | 9.3 km || 
|-id=561 bgcolor=#d6d6d6
| 322561 ||  || — || December 11, 2006 || Kitt Peak || Spacewatch || KOR || align=right | 1.7 km || 
|-id=562 bgcolor=#fefefe
| 322562 ||  || — || March 31, 2001 || Kitt Peak || Spacewatch || — || align=right | 1.3 km || 
|-id=563 bgcolor=#d6d6d6
| 322563 ||  || — || May 5, 2008 || Kitt Peak || Spacewatch || EOS || align=right | 2.4 km || 
|-id=564 bgcolor=#E9E9E9
| 322564 ||  || — || January 23, 2004 || Socorro || LINEAR || — || align=right | 1.0 km || 
|-id=565 bgcolor=#fefefe
| 322565 ||  || — || September 20, 1995 || Kitt Peak || Spacewatch || — || align=right data-sort-value="0.97" | 970 m || 
|-id=566 bgcolor=#d6d6d6
| 322566 ||  || — || September 10, 2004 || Socorro || LINEAR || EOS || align=right | 2.5 km || 
|-id=567 bgcolor=#FA8072
| 322567 ||  || — || August 4, 2005 || Palomar || NEAT || H || align=right data-sort-value="0.78" | 780 m || 
|-id=568 bgcolor=#C2FFFF
| 322568 ||  || — || March 31, 2003 || Apache Point || SDSS || L4 || align=right | 8.7 km || 
|-id=569 bgcolor=#C2FFFF
| 322569 ||  || — || September 14, 2007 || Mauna Kea || P. A. Wiegert || L4 || align=right | 9.6 km || 
|-id=570 bgcolor=#C2FFFF
| 322570 ||  || — || March 31, 2003 || Apache Point || SDSS || L4 || align=right | 13 km || 
|-id=571 bgcolor=#C2FFFF
| 322571 ||  || — || September 3, 2008 || Kitt Peak || Spacewatch || L4 || align=right | 8.0 km || 
|-id=572 bgcolor=#fefefe
| 322572 ||  || — || May 4, 2005 || Kitt Peak || Spacewatch || — || align=right | 1.1 km || 
|-id=573 bgcolor=#E9E9E9
| 322573 ||  || — || October 10, 2002 || Palomar || NEAT || EUN || align=right | 1.5 km || 
|-id=574 bgcolor=#FA8072
| 322574 Werckmeister ||  ||  || August 24, 1990 || La Silla || E. W. Elst || — || align=right | 1.4 km || 
|-id=575 bgcolor=#fefefe
| 322575 ||  || — || August 25, 2000 || Cerro Tololo || M. W. Buie || FLO || align=right data-sort-value="0.63" | 630 m || 
|-id=576 bgcolor=#fefefe
| 322576 ||  || — || September 26, 2003 || Apache Point || SDSS || NYS || align=right data-sort-value="0.56" | 560 m || 
|-id=577 bgcolor=#d6d6d6
| 322577 Stephanhellmich ||  ||  || March 22, 2001 || Cima Ekar || ADAS || — || align=right | 4.1 km || 
|-id=578 bgcolor=#E9E9E9
| 322578 ||  || — || December 13, 2006 || Kitt Peak || Spacewatch || WIT || align=right | 1.5 km || 
|-id=579 bgcolor=#d6d6d6
| 322579 ||  || — || December 7, 2005 || Kitt Peak || Spacewatch || VER || align=right | 3.8 km || 
|-id=580 bgcolor=#d6d6d6
| 322580 ||  || — || December 4, 2005 || Kitt Peak || Spacewatch || — || align=right | 4.2 km || 
|-id=581 bgcolor=#fefefe
| 322581 ||  || — || September 16, 2003 || Kitt Peak || Spacewatch || FLO || align=right data-sort-value="0.78" | 780 m || 
|-id=582 bgcolor=#d6d6d6
| 322582 ||  || — || June 10, 2008 || Kitt Peak || Spacewatch || EOS || align=right | 2.8 km || 
|-id=583 bgcolor=#fefefe
| 322583 ||  || — || November 19, 2007 || Mount Lemmon || Mount Lemmon Survey || — || align=right data-sort-value="0.85" | 850 m || 
|-id=584 bgcolor=#C2FFFF
| 322584 ||  || — || September 14, 2007 || Mount Lemmon || Mount Lemmon Survey || L4 || align=right | 9.5 km || 
|-id=585 bgcolor=#E9E9E9
| 322585 ||  || — || August 27, 2005 || Palomar || NEAT || — || align=right | 3.1 km || 
|-id=586 bgcolor=#d6d6d6
| 322586 ||  || — || November 26, 2005 || Catalina || CSS || — || align=right | 4.6 km || 
|-id=587 bgcolor=#d6d6d6
| 322587 ||  || — || April 15, 2008 || Mount Lemmon || Mount Lemmon Survey || — || align=right | 4.0 km || 
|-id=588 bgcolor=#d6d6d6
| 322588 ||  || — || November 25, 2005 || Catalina || CSS || EMA || align=right | 5.1 km || 
|-id=589 bgcolor=#fefefe
| 322589 ||  || — || November 30, 2003 || Kitt Peak || Spacewatch || — || align=right data-sort-value="0.96" | 960 m || 
|-id=590 bgcolor=#d6d6d6
| 322590 ||  || — || November 29, 2005 || Mount Lemmon || Mount Lemmon Survey || — || align=right | 3.5 km || 
|-id=591 bgcolor=#fefefe
| 322591 ||  || — || September 21, 2003 || Kitt Peak || Spacewatch || FLO || align=right data-sort-value="0.78" | 780 m || 
|-id=592 bgcolor=#E9E9E9
| 322592 ||  || — || December 11, 2006 || Kitt Peak || Spacewatch || — || align=right | 3.5 km || 
|-id=593 bgcolor=#d6d6d6
| 322593 ||  || — || October 4, 2004 || Kitt Peak || Spacewatch || — || align=right | 3.0 km || 
|-id=594 bgcolor=#E9E9E9
| 322594 ||  || — || December 17, 2007 || Mount Lemmon || Mount Lemmon Survey || — || align=right | 1.2 km || 
|-id=595 bgcolor=#E9E9E9
| 322595 ||  || — || October 19, 2006 || Catalina || CSS || — || align=right | 1.8 km || 
|-id=596 bgcolor=#fefefe
| 322596 ||  || — || October 19, 1995 || Kitt Peak || Spacewatch || — || align=right | 1.3 km || 
|-id=597 bgcolor=#fefefe
| 322597 ||  || — || April 1, 2005 || Kitt Peak || Spacewatch || NYS || align=right data-sort-value="0.75" | 750 m || 
|-id=598 bgcolor=#fefefe
| 322598 ||  || — || November 16, 2003 || Kitt Peak || Spacewatch || NYS || align=right data-sort-value="0.86" | 860 m || 
|-id=599 bgcolor=#d6d6d6
| 322599 ||  || — || November 25, 2005 || Catalina || CSS || — || align=right | 4.3 km || 
|-id=600 bgcolor=#d6d6d6
| 322600 ||  || — || November 10, 2005 || Mount Lemmon || Mount Lemmon Survey || — || align=right | 3.0 km || 
|}

322601–322700 

|-bgcolor=#fefefe
| 322601 ||  || — || October 9, 2004 || Kitt Peak || Spacewatch || — || align=right data-sort-value="0.77" | 770 m || 
|-id=602 bgcolor=#fefefe
| 322602 ||  || — || July 24, 2003 || Palomar || NEAT || V || align=right data-sort-value="0.87" | 870 m || 
|-id=603 bgcolor=#fefefe
| 322603 ||  || — || February 19, 2001 || Socorro || LINEAR || MAS || align=right data-sort-value="0.99" | 990 m || 
|-id=604 bgcolor=#E9E9E9
| 322604 ||  || — || November 23, 2006 || Kitt Peak || Spacewatch || — || align=right | 1.8 km || 
|-id=605 bgcolor=#C2FFFF
| 322605 ||  || — || February 2, 2001 || Kitt Peak || Spacewatch || L4 || align=right | 12 km || 
|-id=606 bgcolor=#E9E9E9
| 322606 ||  || — || September 24, 1960 || Palomar || PLS || — || align=right | 2.6 km || 
|-id=607 bgcolor=#d6d6d6
| 322607 ||  || — || September 24, 1960 || Palomar || PLS || — || align=right | 2.9 km || 
|-id=608 bgcolor=#fefefe
| 322608 ||  || — || September 24, 1960 || Palomar || PLS || NYS || align=right data-sort-value="0.84" | 840 m || 
|-id=609 bgcolor=#fefefe
| 322609 ||  || — || September 29, 1973 || Palomar || PLS || FLO || align=right data-sort-value="0.73" | 730 m || 
|-id=610 bgcolor=#d6d6d6
| 322610 ||  || — || September 30, 1973 || Palomar || PLS || — || align=right | 4.4 km || 
|-id=611 bgcolor=#fefefe
| 322611 ||  || — || October 16, 1977 || Palomar || PLS || FLO || align=right data-sort-value="0.66" | 660 m || 
|-id=612 bgcolor=#E9E9E9
| 322612 ||  || — || September 26, 1989 || Calar Alto || J. M. Baur, K. Birkle || ADE || align=right | 3.3 km || 
|-id=613 bgcolor=#fefefe
| 322613 ||  || — || August 10, 1994 || La Silla || E. W. Elst || — || align=right | 1.0 km || 
|-id=614 bgcolor=#fefefe
| 322614 ||  || — || September 27, 1994 || Kitt Peak || Spacewatch || MAS || align=right data-sort-value="0.90" | 900 m || 
|-id=615 bgcolor=#E9E9E9
| 322615 ||  || — || March 2, 1995 || Kitt Peak || Spacewatch || — || align=right | 1.6 km || 
|-id=616 bgcolor=#E9E9E9
| 322616 ||  || — || April 6, 1995 || Kitt Peak || Spacewatch || — || align=right | 2.0 km || 
|-id=617 bgcolor=#d6d6d6
| 322617 ||  || — || September 19, 1995 || Kitt Peak || Spacewatch || KOR || align=right | 1.4 km || 
|-id=618 bgcolor=#E9E9E9
| 322618 ||  || — || September 20, 1995 || Kitt Peak || Spacewatch || — || align=right | 2.5 km || 
|-id=619 bgcolor=#fefefe
| 322619 ||  || — || September 30, 1995 || Kitt Peak || Spacewatch || — || align=right data-sort-value="0.87" | 870 m || 
|-id=620 bgcolor=#d6d6d6
| 322620 ||  || — || October 20, 1995 || Kitt Peak || Spacewatch || KOR || align=right | 1.4 km || 
|-id=621 bgcolor=#d6d6d6
| 322621 ||  || — || November 16, 1995 || Kitt Peak || Spacewatch || CHA || align=right | 2.4 km || 
|-id=622 bgcolor=#fefefe
| 322622 ||  || — || December 14, 1995 || Kitt Peak || Spacewatch || — || align=right | 1.00 km || 
|-id=623 bgcolor=#d6d6d6
| 322623 ||  || — || March 12, 1996 || Kitt Peak || Spacewatch || — || align=right | 3.1 km || 
|-id=624 bgcolor=#E9E9E9
| 322624 ||  || — || October 4, 1996 || Kitt Peak || Spacewatch || — || align=right | 2.2 km || 
|-id=625 bgcolor=#E9E9E9
| 322625 ||  || — || October 7, 1996 || Kitt Peak || Spacewatch || — || align=right | 2.3 km || 
|-id=626 bgcolor=#E9E9E9
| 322626 ||  || — || October 10, 1996 || Kitt Peak || Spacewatch || — || align=right | 2.0 km || 
|-id=627 bgcolor=#fefefe
| 322627 ||  || — || April 28, 1997 || Kitt Peak || Spacewatch || MAS || align=right data-sort-value="0.71" | 710 m || 
|-id=628 bgcolor=#fefefe
| 322628 ||  || — || June 1, 1997 || Kitt Peak || Spacewatch || — || align=right | 1.1 km || 
|-id=629 bgcolor=#FA8072
| 322629 ||  || — || October 8, 1997 || Kitt Peak || Spacewatch || — || align=right data-sort-value="0.67" | 670 m || 
|-id=630 bgcolor=#E9E9E9
| 322630 ||  || — || April 20, 1998 || Kitt Peak || Spacewatch || — || align=right | 2.1 km || 
|-id=631 bgcolor=#d6d6d6
| 322631 ||  || — || August 26, 1998 || La Silla || E. W. Elst || — || align=right | 3.1 km || 
|-id=632 bgcolor=#d6d6d6
| 322632 ||  || — || September 14, 1998 || Kitt Peak || Spacewatch || — || align=right | 4.1 km || 
|-id=633 bgcolor=#d6d6d6
| 322633 ||  || — || September 14, 1998 || Socorro || LINEAR || — || align=right | 6.2 km || 
|-id=634 bgcolor=#d6d6d6
| 322634 ||  || — || September 18, 1998 || Kitt Peak || Spacewatch || — || align=right | 3.4 km || 
|-id=635 bgcolor=#fefefe
| 322635 ||  || — || September 19, 1998 || Kitt Peak || Spacewatch || — || align=right | 1.3 km || 
|-id=636 bgcolor=#d6d6d6
| 322636 ||  || — || September 26, 1998 || Kitt Peak || Spacewatch || EOS || align=right | 2.2 km || 
|-id=637 bgcolor=#fefefe
| 322637 ||  || — || September 26, 1998 || Socorro || LINEAR || — || align=right | 1.3 km || 
|-id=638 bgcolor=#d6d6d6
| 322638 ||  || — || September 26, 1998 || Socorro || LINEAR || — || align=right | 3.5 km || 
|-id=639 bgcolor=#d6d6d6
| 322639 ||  || — || September 26, 1998 || Socorro || LINEAR || TIR || align=right | 3.7 km || 
|-id=640 bgcolor=#fefefe
| 322640 ||  || — || September 26, 1998 || Socorro || LINEAR || V || align=right | 1.0 km || 
|-id=641 bgcolor=#d6d6d6
| 322641 ||  || — || September 19, 1998 || Apache Point || SDSS || — || align=right | 2.3 km || 
|-id=642 bgcolor=#d6d6d6
| 322642 ||  || — || October 13, 1998 || Kitt Peak || Spacewatch || — || align=right | 3.8 km || 
|-id=643 bgcolor=#E9E9E9
| 322643 ||  || — || October 13, 1998 || Kitt Peak || Spacewatch || — || align=right data-sort-value="0.80" | 800 m || 
|-id=644 bgcolor=#fefefe
| 322644 ||  || — || October 20, 1998 || Caussols || ODAS || — || align=right | 1.1 km || 
|-id=645 bgcolor=#E9E9E9
| 322645 ||  || — || November 14, 1998 || Kitt Peak || Spacewatch || — || align=right | 1.4 km || 
|-id=646 bgcolor=#E9E9E9
| 322646 ||  || — || November 24, 1998 || Kitt Peak || Spacewatch || — || align=right | 1.1 km || 
|-id=647 bgcolor=#E9E9E9
| 322647 ||  || — || February 10, 1999 || Socorro || LINEAR || — || align=right | 2.5 km || 
|-id=648 bgcolor=#E9E9E9
| 322648 ||  || — || February 7, 1999 || Kitt Peak || Spacewatch || EUN || align=right | 1.5 km || 
|-id=649 bgcolor=#E9E9E9
| 322649 ||  || — || March 14, 1999 || Kitt Peak || Spacewatch || MAR || align=right | 1.2 km || 
|-id=650 bgcolor=#fefefe
| 322650 ||  || — || April 9, 1999 || Kitt Peak || Spacewatch || FLO || align=right data-sort-value="0.63" | 630 m || 
|-id=651 bgcolor=#FA8072
| 322651 ||  || — || May 10, 1999 || Socorro || LINEAR || — || align=right data-sort-value="0.99" | 990 m || 
|-id=652 bgcolor=#FFC2E0
| 322652 ||  || — || May 13, 1999 || Socorro || LINEAR || AMO +1km || align=right | 1.5 km || 
|-id=653 bgcolor=#fefefe
| 322653 ||  || — || May 12, 1999 || Socorro || LINEAR || — || align=right | 1.2 km || 
|-id=654 bgcolor=#E9E9E9
| 322654 ||  || — || June 10, 1999 || Socorro || LINEAR || — || align=right | 1.7 km || 
|-id=655 bgcolor=#E9E9E9
| 322655 ||  || — || June 7, 1999 || Haute Provence || Haute-Provence Obs. || — || align=right | 2.5 km || 
|-id=656 bgcolor=#E9E9E9
| 322656 ||  || — || June 12, 1999 || Socorro || LINEAR || JUN || align=right | 1.4 km || 
|-id=657 bgcolor=#fefefe
| 322657 ||  || — || August 12, 1999 || Kitt Peak || Spacewatch || V || align=right data-sort-value="0.72" | 720 m || 
|-id=658 bgcolor=#fefefe
| 322658 ||  || — || September 8, 1999 || Socorro || LINEAR || PHO || align=right | 1.5 km || 
|-id=659 bgcolor=#fefefe
| 322659 ||  || — || September 7, 1999 || Socorro || LINEAR || — || align=right | 1.1 km || 
|-id=660 bgcolor=#fefefe
| 322660 ||  || — || September 9, 1999 || Socorro || LINEAR || FLO || align=right data-sort-value="0.87" | 870 m || 
|-id=661 bgcolor=#fefefe
| 322661 ||  || — || September 9, 1999 || Socorro || LINEAR || NYS || align=right data-sort-value="0.63" | 630 m || 
|-id=662 bgcolor=#fefefe
| 322662 ||  || — || September 14, 1999 || Kitt Peak || Spacewatch || FLO || align=right data-sort-value="0.65" | 650 m || 
|-id=663 bgcolor=#fefefe
| 322663 ||  || — || September 9, 1999 || Socorro || LINEAR || NYS || align=right data-sort-value="0.72" | 720 m || 
|-id=664 bgcolor=#d6d6d6
| 322664 ||  || — || September 8, 1999 || Kitt Peak || Spacewatch || — || align=right | 2.2 km || 
|-id=665 bgcolor=#d6d6d6
| 322665 ||  || — || September 30, 1999 || Kitt Peak || Spacewatch || — || align=right | 2.3 km || 
|-id=666 bgcolor=#d6d6d6
| 322666 ||  || — || October 4, 1999 || Kitt Peak || Spacewatch || — || align=right | 2.8 km || 
|-id=667 bgcolor=#fefefe
| 322667 ||  || — || October 11, 1999 || Kitt Peak || Spacewatch || V || align=right data-sort-value="0.76" | 760 m || 
|-id=668 bgcolor=#fefefe
| 322668 ||  || — || October 12, 1999 || Kitt Peak || Spacewatch || V || align=right data-sort-value="0.75" | 750 m || 
|-id=669 bgcolor=#d6d6d6
| 322669 ||  || — || October 4, 1999 || Socorro || LINEAR || — || align=right | 3.8 km || 
|-id=670 bgcolor=#fefefe
| 322670 ||  || — || October 6, 1999 || Socorro || LINEAR || NYS || align=right data-sort-value="0.81" | 810 m || 
|-id=671 bgcolor=#fefefe
| 322671 ||  || — || October 6, 1999 || Socorro || LINEAR || — || align=right | 1.2 km || 
|-id=672 bgcolor=#fefefe
| 322672 ||  || — || October 2, 1999 || Catalina || CSS || V || align=right data-sort-value="0.98" | 980 m || 
|-id=673 bgcolor=#fefefe
| 322673 ||  || — || October 6, 1999 || Socorro || LINEAR || NYS || align=right data-sort-value="0.73" | 730 m || 
|-id=674 bgcolor=#d6d6d6
| 322674 ||  || — || October 15, 1999 || Kitt Peak || Spacewatch || — || align=right | 2.5 km || 
|-id=675 bgcolor=#fefefe
| 322675 ||  || — || October 1, 1999 || Catalina || CSS || — || align=right data-sort-value="0.87" | 870 m || 
|-id=676 bgcolor=#fefefe
| 322676 ||  || — || October 2, 1999 || Kitt Peak || Spacewatch || V || align=right data-sort-value="0.83" | 830 m || 
|-id=677 bgcolor=#d6d6d6
| 322677 ||  || — || October 3, 1999 || Kitt Peak || Spacewatch || — || align=right | 2.9 km || 
|-id=678 bgcolor=#fefefe
| 322678 ||  || — || October 10, 1999 || Kitt Peak || Spacewatch || NYS || align=right data-sort-value="0.68" | 680 m || 
|-id=679 bgcolor=#d6d6d6
| 322679 ||  || — || October 29, 1999 || Kitt Peak || Spacewatch || — || align=right | 2.7 km || 
|-id=680 bgcolor=#fefefe
| 322680 ||  || — || November 1, 1999 || Kitt Peak || Spacewatch || — || align=right data-sort-value="0.91" | 910 m || 
|-id=681 bgcolor=#fefefe
| 322681 ||  || — || November 4, 1999 || Kitt Peak || Spacewatch || V || align=right data-sort-value="0.73" | 730 m || 
|-id=682 bgcolor=#d6d6d6
| 322682 ||  || — || November 4, 1999 || Socorro || LINEAR || SAN || align=right | 2.9 km || 
|-id=683 bgcolor=#d6d6d6
| 322683 ||  || — || October 8, 1999 || Kitt Peak || Spacewatch || — || align=right | 2.2 km || 
|-id=684 bgcolor=#fefefe
| 322684 ||  || — || November 6, 1999 || Kitt Peak || Spacewatch || — || align=right data-sort-value="0.98" | 980 m || 
|-id=685 bgcolor=#d6d6d6
| 322685 ||  || — || November 5, 1999 || Socorro || LINEAR || EOS || align=right | 2.5 km || 
|-id=686 bgcolor=#fefefe
| 322686 ||  || — || November 9, 1999 || Socorro || LINEAR || FLO || align=right data-sort-value="0.92" | 920 m || 
|-id=687 bgcolor=#d6d6d6
| 322687 ||  || — || November 9, 1999 || Socorro || LINEAR || TEL || align=right | 2.2 km || 
|-id=688 bgcolor=#d6d6d6
| 322688 ||  || — || November 9, 1999 || Socorro || LINEAR || — || align=right | 5.2 km || 
|-id=689 bgcolor=#fefefe
| 322689 ||  || — || November 14, 1999 || Socorro || LINEAR || — || align=right data-sort-value="0.86" | 860 m || 
|-id=690 bgcolor=#d6d6d6
| 322690 ||  || — || November 14, 1999 || Socorro || LINEAR || EOS || align=right | 2.7 km || 
|-id=691 bgcolor=#d6d6d6
| 322691 ||  || — || November 15, 1999 || Socorro || LINEAR || — || align=right | 4.2 km || 
|-id=692 bgcolor=#d6d6d6
| 322692 ||  || — || November 15, 1999 || Socorro || LINEAR || URS || align=right | 4.3 km || 
|-id=693 bgcolor=#d6d6d6
| 322693 ||  || — || November 29, 1999 || Kitt Peak || Spacewatch || — || align=right | 2.2 km || 
|-id=694 bgcolor=#d6d6d6
| 322694 ||  || — || December 4, 1999 || Ondřejov || P. Pravec || — || align=right | 3.9 km || 
|-id=695 bgcolor=#d6d6d6
| 322695 ||  || — || December 5, 1999 || Kitt Peak || Spacewatch || — || align=right | 4.8 km || 
|-id=696 bgcolor=#d6d6d6
| 322696 ||  || — || December 7, 1999 || Kitt Peak || Spacewatch || — || align=right | 3.2 km || 
|-id=697 bgcolor=#d6d6d6
| 322697 ||  || — || December 8, 1999 || Kitt Peak || Spacewatch || EOS || align=right | 2.6 km || 
|-id=698 bgcolor=#d6d6d6
| 322698 ||  || — || December 27, 1999 || Kitt Peak || Spacewatch || — || align=right | 4.0 km || 
|-id=699 bgcolor=#d6d6d6
| 322699 ||  || — || December 31, 1999 || Kitt Peak || Spacewatch || — || align=right | 3.1 km || 
|-id=700 bgcolor=#d6d6d6
| 322700 ||  || — || January 5, 2000 || Kitt Peak || Spacewatch || THM || align=right | 2.6 km || 
|}

322701–322800 

|-bgcolor=#d6d6d6
| 322701 ||  || — || January 4, 2000 || Socorro || LINEAR || — || align=right | 4.3 km || 
|-id=702 bgcolor=#d6d6d6
| 322702 ||  || — || January 13, 2000 || Kitt Peak || Spacewatch || VER || align=right | 3.3 km || 
|-id=703 bgcolor=#d6d6d6
| 322703 ||  || — || February 2, 2000 || Socorro || LINEAR || — || align=right | 4.5 km || 
|-id=704 bgcolor=#fefefe
| 322704 ||  || — || February 5, 2000 || Kitt Peak || M. W. Buie || — || align=right | 1.1 km || 
|-id=705 bgcolor=#FFC2E0
| 322705 ||  || — || February 26, 2000 || Socorro || LINEAR || APO || align=right data-sort-value="0.53" | 530 m || 
|-id=706 bgcolor=#d6d6d6
| 322706 ||  || — || February 29, 2000 || Socorro || LINEAR || EUP || align=right | 5.7 km || 
|-id=707 bgcolor=#fefefe
| 322707 ||  || — || February 28, 2000 || Kitt Peak || Spacewatch || — || align=right data-sort-value="0.59" | 590 m || 
|-id=708 bgcolor=#E9E9E9
| 322708 ||  || — || February 25, 2000 || Kitt Peak || Spacewatch || — || align=right | 1.0 km || 
|-id=709 bgcolor=#E9E9E9
| 322709 ||  || — || March 25, 2000 || Kitt Peak || Spacewatch || — || align=right data-sort-value="0.88" | 880 m || 
|-id=710 bgcolor=#E9E9E9
| 322710 ||  || — || April 4, 2000 || Socorro || LINEAR || — || align=right | 1.1 km || 
|-id=711 bgcolor=#E9E9E9
| 322711 ||  || — || April 30, 2000 || Prescott || P. G. Comba || EUN || align=right | 1.8 km || 
|-id=712 bgcolor=#E9E9E9
| 322712 ||  || — || May 28, 2000 || Socorro || LINEAR || — || align=right | 1.1 km || 
|-id=713 bgcolor=#B88A00
| 322713 ||  || — || May 26, 2000 || Anderson Mesa || LONEOS || unusual || align=right | 2.4 km || 
|-id=714 bgcolor=#E9E9E9
| 322714 ||  || — || May 25, 2000 || Kitt Peak || Spacewatch || — || align=right | 2.1 km || 
|-id=715 bgcolor=#E9E9E9
| 322715 ||  || — || June 8, 2000 || Socorro || LINEAR || — || align=right | 1.9 km || 
|-id=716 bgcolor=#E9E9E9
| 322716 ||  || — || August 6, 2000 || Siding Spring || R. H. McNaught || — || align=right | 1.2 km || 
|-id=717 bgcolor=#E9E9E9
| 322717 ||  || — || August 1, 2000 || Socorro || LINEAR || — || align=right | 2.2 km || 
|-id=718 bgcolor=#E9E9E9
| 322718 ||  || — || August 24, 2000 || Socorro || LINEAR || — || align=right | 3.4 km || 
|-id=719 bgcolor=#fefefe
| 322719 ||  || — || August 8, 2000 || Socorro || LINEAR || — || align=right data-sort-value="0.97" | 970 m || 
|-id=720 bgcolor=#E9E9E9
| 322720 ||  || — || September 1, 2000 || Socorro || LINEAR || BAR || align=right | 2.3 km || 
|-id=721 bgcolor=#E9E9E9
| 322721 ||  || — || September 1, 2000 || Socorro || LINEAR || JUN || align=right | 1.6 km || 
|-id=722 bgcolor=#E9E9E9
| 322722 ||  || — || September 3, 2000 || Socorro || LINEAR || — || align=right | 2.0 km || 
|-id=723 bgcolor=#E9E9E9
| 322723 ||  || — || September 23, 2000 || Socorro || LINEAR || GAL || align=right | 1.9 km || 
|-id=724 bgcolor=#E9E9E9
| 322724 ||  || — || September 23, 2000 || Socorro || LINEAR || — || align=right | 2.2 km || 
|-id=725 bgcolor=#E9E9E9
| 322725 ||  || — || September 23, 2000 || Socorro || LINEAR || ADE || align=right | 3.2 km || 
|-id=726 bgcolor=#E9E9E9
| 322726 ||  || — || September 23, 2000 || Socorro || LINEAR || — || align=right | 3.5 km || 
|-id=727 bgcolor=#E9E9E9
| 322727 ||  || — || September 24, 2000 || Socorro || LINEAR || — || align=right | 1.6 km || 
|-id=728 bgcolor=#E9E9E9
| 322728 ||  || — || September 26, 2000 || Socorro || LINEAR || GEF || align=right | 1.4 km || 
|-id=729 bgcolor=#E9E9E9
| 322729 ||  || — || September 23, 2000 || Socorro || LINEAR || DOR || align=right | 3.2 km || 
|-id=730 bgcolor=#E9E9E9
| 322730 ||  || — || September 24, 2000 || Socorro || LINEAR || — || align=right | 3.2 km || 
|-id=731 bgcolor=#E9E9E9
| 322731 ||  || — || September 30, 2000 || Ondřejov || P. Kušnirák, P. Pravec || — || align=right | 3.1 km || 
|-id=732 bgcolor=#fefefe
| 322732 ||  || — || September 24, 2000 || Socorro || LINEAR || — || align=right data-sort-value="0.77" | 770 m || 
|-id=733 bgcolor=#E9E9E9
| 322733 ||  || — || September 30, 2000 || Socorro || LINEAR || — || align=right | 4.0 km || 
|-id=734 bgcolor=#E9E9E9
| 322734 ||  || — || September 24, 2000 || Socorro || LINEAR || — || align=right | 2.4 km || 
|-id=735 bgcolor=#E9E9E9
| 322735 ||  || — || September 24, 2000 || Socorro || LINEAR || EUN || align=right | 2.5 km || 
|-id=736 bgcolor=#E9E9E9
| 322736 ||  || — || September 24, 2000 || Socorro || LINEAR || — || align=right | 2.7 km || 
|-id=737 bgcolor=#fefefe
| 322737 ||  || — || September 26, 2000 || Socorro || LINEAR || — || align=right data-sort-value="0.89" | 890 m || 
|-id=738 bgcolor=#fefefe
| 322738 ||  || — || September 28, 2000 || Socorro || LINEAR || FLO || align=right data-sort-value="0.77" | 770 m || 
|-id=739 bgcolor=#E9E9E9
| 322739 ||  || — || September 28, 2000 || Socorro || LINEAR || JUN || align=right | 1.8 km || 
|-id=740 bgcolor=#E9E9E9
| 322740 ||  || — || October 3, 2000 || Kitt Peak || Spacewatch || BAR || align=right | 1.8 km || 
|-id=741 bgcolor=#E9E9E9
| 322741 ||  || — || October 1, 2000 || Socorro || LINEAR || — || align=right | 3.0 km || 
|-id=742 bgcolor=#fefefe
| 322742 ||  || — || October 1, 2000 || Socorro || LINEAR || FLO || align=right data-sort-value="0.80" | 800 m || 
|-id=743 bgcolor=#fefefe
| 322743 ||  || — || October 25, 2000 || Socorro || LINEAR || — || align=right | 1.0 km || 
|-id=744 bgcolor=#fefefe
| 322744 ||  || — || November 1, 2000 || Socorro || LINEAR || — || align=right | 1.2 km || 
|-id=745 bgcolor=#fefefe
| 322745 ||  || — || November 23, 2000 || Kitt Peak || Spacewatch || NYS || align=right data-sort-value="0.54" | 540 m || 
|-id=746 bgcolor=#d6d6d6
| 322746 ||  || — || November 20, 2000 || Socorro || LINEAR || BRA || align=right | 2.1 km || 
|-id=747 bgcolor=#E9E9E9
| 322747 ||  || — || November 30, 2000 || Socorro || LINEAR || — || align=right | 3.3 km || 
|-id=748 bgcolor=#d6d6d6
| 322748 ||  || — || December 30, 2000 || Kitt Peak || Spacewatch || — || align=right | 3.7 km || 
|-id=749 bgcolor=#d6d6d6
| 322749 ||  || — || December 31, 2000 || Kitt Peak || Spacewatch || — || align=right | 2.3 km || 
|-id=750 bgcolor=#d6d6d6
| 322750 ||  || — || December 30, 2000 || Socorro || LINEAR || — || align=right | 3.4 km || 
|-id=751 bgcolor=#d6d6d6
| 322751 || 2001 BM || — || January 17, 2001 || Oizumi || T. Kobayashi || — || align=right | 5.0 km || 
|-id=752 bgcolor=#fefefe
| 322752 ||  || — || January 18, 2001 || Socorro || LINEAR || H || align=right data-sort-value="0.66" | 660 m || 
|-id=753 bgcolor=#fefefe
| 322753 ||  || — || January 31, 2001 || Socorro || LINEAR || H || align=right data-sort-value="0.77" | 770 m || 
|-id=754 bgcolor=#d6d6d6
| 322754 ||  || — || January 4, 2001 || Haleakala || NEAT || — || align=right | 4.2 km || 
|-id=755 bgcolor=#d6d6d6
| 322755 ||  || — || February 1, 2001 || Anderson Mesa || LONEOS || — || align=right | 4.5 km || 
|-id=756 bgcolor=#FFC2E0
| 322756 ||  || — || February 13, 2001 || Socorro || LINEAR || ATE || align=right data-sort-value="0.58" | 580 m || 
|-id=757 bgcolor=#fefefe
| 322757 ||  || — || February 16, 2001 || Socorro || LINEAR || — || align=right | 1.0 km || 
|-id=758 bgcolor=#d6d6d6
| 322758 ||  || — || February 2, 2001 || Socorro || LINEAR || — || align=right | 4.9 km || 
|-id=759 bgcolor=#d6d6d6
| 322759 ||  || — || January 26, 2001 || Kitt Peak || Spacewatch || — || align=right | 3.6 km || 
|-id=760 bgcolor=#d6d6d6
| 322760 ||  || — || March 2, 2001 || Anderson Mesa || LONEOS || — || align=right | 3.3 km || 
|-id=761 bgcolor=#fefefe
| 322761 ||  || — || March 3, 2001 || Socorro || LINEAR || H || align=right data-sort-value="0.70" | 700 m || 
|-id=762 bgcolor=#FA8072
| 322762 ||  || — || March 16, 2001 || Socorro || LINEAR || — || align=right | 1.7 km || 
|-id=763 bgcolor=#FFC2E0
| 322763 ||  || — || March 18, 2001 || Socorro || LINEAR || APO +1km || align=right | 1.3 km || 
|-id=764 bgcolor=#d6d6d6
| 322764 ||  || — || March 19, 2001 || Anderson Mesa || LONEOS || — || align=right | 4.0 km || 
|-id=765 bgcolor=#d6d6d6
| 322765 ||  || — || March 18, 2001 || Socorro || LINEAR || — || align=right | 4.9 km || 
|-id=766 bgcolor=#fefefe
| 322766 ||  || — || March 19, 2001 || Socorro || LINEAR || — || align=right data-sort-value="0.98" | 980 m || 
|-id=767 bgcolor=#d6d6d6
| 322767 ||  || — || March 19, 2001 || Anderson Mesa || LONEOS || — || align=right | 3.9 km || 
|-id=768 bgcolor=#d6d6d6
| 322768 ||  || — || March 23, 2001 || Anderson Mesa || LONEOS || — || align=right | 3.1 km || 
|-id=769 bgcolor=#fefefe
| 322769 ||  || — || March 21, 2001 || Haleakala || NEAT || NYS || align=right data-sort-value="0.83" | 830 m || 
|-id=770 bgcolor=#d6d6d6
| 322770 ||  || — || March 23, 2001 || Haleakala || NEAT || — || align=right | 6.2 km || 
|-id=771 bgcolor=#d6d6d6
| 322771 ||  || — || March 27, 2001 || Anderson Mesa || LONEOS || — || align=right | 4.0 km || 
|-id=772 bgcolor=#fefefe
| 322772 ||  || — || March 24, 2001 || Haleakala || NEAT || H || align=right | 1.1 km || 
|-id=773 bgcolor=#fefefe
| 322773 ||  || — || March 20, 2001 || Anderson Mesa || LONEOS || — || align=right | 1.3 km || 
|-id=774 bgcolor=#fefefe
| 322774 ||  || — || March 20, 2001 || Kitt Peak || Spacewatch || — || align=right data-sort-value="0.74" | 740 m || 
|-id=775 bgcolor=#FFC2E0
| 322775 ||  || — || April 21, 2001 || Socorro || LINEAR || AMO +1km || align=right | 1.6 km || 
|-id=776 bgcolor=#d6d6d6
| 322776 ||  || — || May 14, 2001 || Kitt Peak || Spacewatch || — || align=right | 3.6 km || 
|-id=777 bgcolor=#d6d6d6
| 322777 ||  || — || May 22, 2001 || Socorro || LINEAR || — || align=right | 5.4 km || 
|-id=778 bgcolor=#fefefe
| 322778 ||  || — || May 16, 2001 || Socorro || LINEAR || H || align=right | 1.3 km || 
|-id=779 bgcolor=#E9E9E9
| 322779 ||  || — || June 25, 2001 || Palomar || NEAT || EUN || align=right | 2.1 km || 
|-id=780 bgcolor=#E9E9E9
| 322780 ||  || — || July 17, 2001 || Anderson Mesa || LONEOS || — || align=right | 1.9 km || 
|-id=781 bgcolor=#E9E9E9
| 322781 ||  || — || July 21, 2001 || Ondřejov || P. Pravec, L. Kotková || — || align=right | 1.3 km || 
|-id=782 bgcolor=#E9E9E9
| 322782 ||  || — || July 27, 2001 || Anderson Mesa || LONEOS || — || align=right | 1.8 km || 
|-id=783 bgcolor=#E9E9E9
| 322783 ||  || — || August 14, 2001 || Palomar || NEAT || — || align=right | 1.5 km || 
|-id=784 bgcolor=#E9E9E9
| 322784 ||  || — || August 16, 2001 || Socorro || LINEAR || — || align=right | 2.6 km || 
|-id=785 bgcolor=#E9E9E9
| 322785 ||  || — || August 16, 2001 || Socorro || LINEAR || — || align=right | 1.4 km || 
|-id=786 bgcolor=#E9E9E9
| 322786 ||  || — || August 15, 2001 || Haleakala || NEAT || — || align=right | 1.5 km || 
|-id=787 bgcolor=#E9E9E9
| 322787 ||  || — || August 16, 2001 || Socorro || LINEAR || — || align=right | 1.7 km || 
|-id=788 bgcolor=#E9E9E9
| 322788 ||  || — || August 16, 2001 || Socorro || LINEAR || — || align=right | 1.2 km || 
|-id=789 bgcolor=#E9E9E9
| 322789 ||  || — || August 19, 2001 || Socorro || LINEAR || ADE || align=right | 2.6 km || 
|-id=790 bgcolor=#E9E9E9
| 322790 ||  || — || August 16, 2001 || Palomar || NEAT || — || align=right | 1.7 km || 
|-id=791 bgcolor=#E9E9E9
| 322791 ||  || — || August 20, 2001 || Socorro || LINEAR || — || align=right | 1.4 km || 
|-id=792 bgcolor=#E9E9E9
| 322792 ||  || — || August 22, 2001 || Socorro || LINEAR || — || align=right | 2.0 km || 
|-id=793 bgcolor=#E9E9E9
| 322793 ||  || — || August 24, 2001 || Socorro || LINEAR || — || align=right | 1.7 km || 
|-id=794 bgcolor=#E9E9E9
| 322794 ||  || — || August 23, 2001 || Anderson Mesa || LONEOS || KRM || align=right | 2.5 km || 
|-id=795 bgcolor=#E9E9E9
| 322795 ||  || — || August 24, 2001 || Socorro || LINEAR || — || align=right | 1.9 km || 
|-id=796 bgcolor=#E9E9E9
| 322796 ||  || — || August 24, 2001 || Socorro || LINEAR || — || align=right | 1.9 km || 
|-id=797 bgcolor=#E9E9E9
| 322797 ||  || — || August 24, 2001 || Socorro || LINEAR || JUN || align=right | 1.6 km || 
|-id=798 bgcolor=#E9E9E9
| 322798 ||  || — || August 25, 2001 || Socorro || LINEAR || MAR || align=right | 1.2 km || 
|-id=799 bgcolor=#E9E9E9
| 322799 ||  || — || August 19, 2001 || Socorro || LINEAR || EUN || align=right | 1.8 km || 
|-id=800 bgcolor=#E9E9E9
| 322800 ||  || — || September 10, 2001 || Socorro || LINEAR || — || align=right | 1.9 km || 
|}

322801–322900 

|-bgcolor=#E9E9E9
| 322801 ||  || — || September 10, 2001 || Socorro || LINEAR || — || align=right | 2.3 km || 
|-id=802 bgcolor=#E9E9E9
| 322802 ||  || — || September 10, 2001 || Socorro || LINEAR || — || align=right | 2.3 km || 
|-id=803 bgcolor=#E9E9E9
| 322803 ||  || — || September 10, 2001 || Socorro || LINEAR || — || align=right | 1.5 km || 
|-id=804 bgcolor=#E9E9E9
| 322804 ||  || — || September 10, 2001 || Socorro || LINEAR || — || align=right | 1.5 km || 
|-id=805 bgcolor=#E9E9E9
| 322805 ||  || — || September 11, 2001 || Anderson Mesa || LONEOS || — || align=right | 2.7 km || 
|-id=806 bgcolor=#E9E9E9
| 322806 ||  || — || September 12, 2001 || Socorro || LINEAR || — || align=right | 1.1 km || 
|-id=807 bgcolor=#E9E9E9
| 322807 ||  || — || September 12, 2001 || Socorro || LINEAR || HNS || align=right | 1.4 km || 
|-id=808 bgcolor=#E9E9E9
| 322808 ||  || — || September 12, 2001 || Socorro || LINEAR || — || align=right | 2.1 km || 
|-id=809 bgcolor=#E9E9E9
| 322809 ||  || — || September 11, 2001 || Anderson Mesa || LONEOS || MAR || align=right | 1.1 km || 
|-id=810 bgcolor=#E9E9E9
| 322810 ||  || — || September 16, 2001 || Socorro || LINEAR || — || align=right | 1.1 km || 
|-id=811 bgcolor=#E9E9E9
| 322811 ||  || — || September 16, 2001 || Socorro || LINEAR || ADE || align=right | 2.2 km || 
|-id=812 bgcolor=#E9E9E9
| 322812 ||  || — || September 16, 2001 || Socorro || LINEAR || RAF || align=right | 1.2 km || 
|-id=813 bgcolor=#E9E9E9
| 322813 ||  || — || September 16, 2001 || Socorro || LINEAR || — || align=right | 2.5 km || 
|-id=814 bgcolor=#E9E9E9
| 322814 ||  || — || September 17, 2001 || Socorro || LINEAR || — || align=right | 2.4 km || 
|-id=815 bgcolor=#E9E9E9
| 322815 ||  || — || September 17, 2001 || Socorro || LINEAR || — || align=right | 2.7 km || 
|-id=816 bgcolor=#E9E9E9
| 322816 ||  || — || September 20, 2001 || Socorro || LINEAR || HNS || align=right | 1.3 km || 
|-id=817 bgcolor=#E9E9E9
| 322817 ||  || — || September 20, 2001 || Socorro || LINEAR || — || align=right | 1.8 km || 
|-id=818 bgcolor=#E9E9E9
| 322818 ||  || — || September 20, 2001 || Socorro || LINEAR || EUN || align=right | 1.4 km || 
|-id=819 bgcolor=#E9E9E9
| 322819 ||  || — || September 16, 2001 || Socorro || LINEAR || — || align=right data-sort-value="0.97" | 970 m || 
|-id=820 bgcolor=#E9E9E9
| 322820 ||  || — || September 17, 2001 || Socorro || LINEAR || — || align=right | 1.9 km || 
|-id=821 bgcolor=#E9E9E9
| 322821 ||  || — || September 19, 2001 || Socorro || LINEAR || — || align=right | 1.8 km || 
|-id=822 bgcolor=#E9E9E9
| 322822 ||  || — || September 19, 2001 || Socorro || LINEAR || — || align=right | 1.9 km || 
|-id=823 bgcolor=#E9E9E9
| 322823 ||  || — || September 19, 2001 || Socorro || LINEAR || — || align=right | 2.0 km || 
|-id=824 bgcolor=#E9E9E9
| 322824 ||  || — || September 19, 2001 || Socorro || LINEAR || — || align=right | 3.2 km || 
|-id=825 bgcolor=#E9E9E9
| 322825 ||  || — || September 19, 2001 || Socorro || LINEAR || HNS || align=right | 1.6 km || 
|-id=826 bgcolor=#E9E9E9
| 322826 ||  || — || September 19, 2001 || Socorro || LINEAR || JUN || align=right | 1.6 km || 
|-id=827 bgcolor=#E9E9E9
| 322827 ||  || — || September 19, 2001 || Kitt Peak || Spacewatch || MIS || align=right | 2.5 km || 
|-id=828 bgcolor=#E9E9E9
| 322828 ||  || — || September 20, 2001 || Socorro || LINEAR || — || align=right | 1.2 km || 
|-id=829 bgcolor=#E9E9E9
| 322829 ||  || — || September 19, 2001 || Socorro || LINEAR || — || align=right | 2.2 km || 
|-id=830 bgcolor=#E9E9E9
| 322830 ||  || — || September 19, 2001 || Kitt Peak || Spacewatch || — || align=right | 1.6 km || 
|-id=831 bgcolor=#E9E9E9
| 322831 ||  || — || September 21, 2001 || Palomar || NEAT || MAR || align=right | 1.4 km || 
|-id=832 bgcolor=#E9E9E9
| 322832 ||  || — || September 21, 2001 || Socorro || LINEAR || EUN || align=right | 1.5 km || 
|-id=833 bgcolor=#E9E9E9
| 322833 ||  || — || October 9, 2001 || Socorro || LINEAR || — || align=right | 2.0 km || 
|-id=834 bgcolor=#fefefe
| 322834 ||  || — || October 9, 2001 || Kitt Peak || Spacewatch || — || align=right data-sort-value="0.62" | 620 m || 
|-id=835 bgcolor=#E9E9E9
| 322835 ||  || — || October 13, 2001 || Socorro || LINEAR || IAN || align=right | 1.3 km || 
|-id=836 bgcolor=#E9E9E9
| 322836 ||  || — || October 13, 2001 || Socorro || LINEAR || — || align=right | 2.3 km || 
|-id=837 bgcolor=#E9E9E9
| 322837 ||  || — || October 13, 2001 || Socorro || LINEAR || — || align=right | 1.6 km || 
|-id=838 bgcolor=#E9E9E9
| 322838 ||  || — || October 14, 2001 || Socorro || LINEAR || — || align=right | 1.8 km || 
|-id=839 bgcolor=#E9E9E9
| 322839 ||  || — || October 14, 2001 || Socorro || LINEAR || — || align=right | 1.6 km || 
|-id=840 bgcolor=#E9E9E9
| 322840 ||  || — || October 14, 2001 || Socorro || LINEAR || EUN || align=right | 1.6 km || 
|-id=841 bgcolor=#E9E9E9
| 322841 ||  || — || October 14, 2001 || Socorro || LINEAR || — || align=right | 2.5 km || 
|-id=842 bgcolor=#E9E9E9
| 322842 ||  || — || October 14, 2001 || Socorro || LINEAR || — || align=right | 2.0 km || 
|-id=843 bgcolor=#E9E9E9
| 322843 ||  || — || October 14, 2001 || Socorro || LINEAR || HNS || align=right | 1.4 km || 
|-id=844 bgcolor=#E9E9E9
| 322844 ||  || — || October 12, 2001 || Haleakala || NEAT || EUN || align=right | 1.5 km || 
|-id=845 bgcolor=#E9E9E9
| 322845 ||  || — || October 14, 2001 || Socorro || LINEAR || AEO || align=right | 1.2 km || 
|-id=846 bgcolor=#E9E9E9
| 322846 ||  || — || October 14, 2001 || Socorro || LINEAR || EUN || align=right | 1.2 km || 
|-id=847 bgcolor=#E9E9E9
| 322847 ||  || — || October 14, 2001 || Socorro || LINEAR || — || align=right | 2.3 km || 
|-id=848 bgcolor=#E9E9E9
| 322848 ||  || — || October 14, 2001 || Socorro || LINEAR || — || align=right | 2.4 km || 
|-id=849 bgcolor=#E9E9E9
| 322849 ||  || — || October 15, 2001 || Palomar || NEAT || — || align=right | 2.0 km || 
|-id=850 bgcolor=#E9E9E9
| 322850 ||  || — || October 14, 2001 || Apache Point || SDSS || — || align=right data-sort-value="0.93" | 930 m || 
|-id=851 bgcolor=#E9E9E9
| 322851 ||  || — || October 15, 2001 || Palomar || NEAT || — || align=right | 1.4 km || 
|-id=852 bgcolor=#E9E9E9
| 322852 ||  || — || October 16, 2001 || Socorro || LINEAR || — || align=right | 2.7 km || 
|-id=853 bgcolor=#E9E9E9
| 322853 ||  || — || October 17, 2001 || Socorro || LINEAR || — || align=right | 2.8 km || 
|-id=854 bgcolor=#E9E9E9
| 322854 ||  || — || October 17, 2001 || Socorro || LINEAR || EUN || align=right | 1.1 km || 
|-id=855 bgcolor=#E9E9E9
| 322855 ||  || — || October 18, 2001 || Socorro || LINEAR || EUN || align=right | 1.4 km || 
|-id=856 bgcolor=#E9E9E9
| 322856 ||  || — || October 20, 2001 || Socorro || LINEAR || — || align=right | 1.8 km || 
|-id=857 bgcolor=#E9E9E9
| 322857 ||  || — || October 20, 2001 || Socorro || LINEAR || — || align=right | 3.1 km || 
|-id=858 bgcolor=#E9E9E9
| 322858 ||  || — || October 21, 2001 || Kitt Peak || Spacewatch || — || align=right | 1.0 km || 
|-id=859 bgcolor=#E9E9E9
| 322859 ||  || — || October 17, 2001 || Socorro || LINEAR || — || align=right | 2.0 km || 
|-id=860 bgcolor=#E9E9E9
| 322860 ||  || — || October 20, 2001 || Socorro || LINEAR || — || align=right | 1.9 km || 
|-id=861 bgcolor=#E9E9E9
| 322861 ||  || — || October 20, 2001 || Socorro || LINEAR || MAR || align=right | 1.1 km || 
|-id=862 bgcolor=#E9E9E9
| 322862 ||  || — || October 23, 2001 || Palomar || NEAT || HNS || align=right | 1.6 km || 
|-id=863 bgcolor=#E9E9E9
| 322863 ||  || — || October 20, 2001 || Socorro || LINEAR || EUN || align=right | 1.3 km || 
|-id=864 bgcolor=#E9E9E9
| 322864 ||  || — || October 23, 2001 || Socorro || LINEAR || — || align=right | 1.9 km || 
|-id=865 bgcolor=#E9E9E9
| 322865 ||  || — || October 23, 2001 || Socorro || LINEAR || — || align=right | 1.6 km || 
|-id=866 bgcolor=#E9E9E9
| 322866 ||  || — || October 23, 2001 || Socorro || LINEAR || — || align=right | 3.2 km || 
|-id=867 bgcolor=#E9E9E9
| 322867 ||  || — || October 23, 2001 || Socorro || LINEAR || — || align=right | 2.1 km || 
|-id=868 bgcolor=#E9E9E9
| 322868 ||  || — || October 24, 2001 || Socorro || LINEAR || — || align=right | 2.0 km || 
|-id=869 bgcolor=#E9E9E9
| 322869 ||  || — || October 18, 2001 || Socorro || LINEAR || IAN || align=right | 1.0 km || 
|-id=870 bgcolor=#E9E9E9
| 322870 ||  || — || October 19, 2001 || Palomar || NEAT || — || align=right | 1.4 km || 
|-id=871 bgcolor=#E9E9E9
| 322871 ||  || — || October 23, 2001 || Socorro || LINEAR || — || align=right | 1.7 km || 
|-id=872 bgcolor=#E9E9E9
| 322872 ||  || — || October 24, 2001 || Socorro || LINEAR || HEN || align=right | 1.1 km || 
|-id=873 bgcolor=#E9E9E9
| 322873 ||  || — || November 10, 2001 || Socorro || LINEAR || MAR || align=right | 1.7 km || 
|-id=874 bgcolor=#E9E9E9
| 322874 ||  || — || November 12, 2001 || Kitt Peak || Spacewatch || — || align=right | 1.6 km || 
|-id=875 bgcolor=#E9E9E9
| 322875 ||  || — || November 12, 2001 || Socorro || LINEAR || HNS || align=right | 1.6 km || 
|-id=876 bgcolor=#E9E9E9
| 322876 ||  || — || November 11, 2001 || Apache Point || SDSS || WIT || align=right | 1.1 km || 
|-id=877 bgcolor=#E9E9E9
| 322877 ||  || — || November 17, 2001 || Socorro || LINEAR || — || align=right | 1.6 km || 
|-id=878 bgcolor=#E9E9E9
| 322878 ||  || — || November 17, 2001 || Socorro || LINEAR || — || align=right | 3.6 km || 
|-id=879 bgcolor=#E9E9E9
| 322879 ||  || — || November 18, 2001 || Socorro || LINEAR || — || align=right | 2.1 km || 
|-id=880 bgcolor=#E9E9E9
| 322880 ||  || — || November 20, 2001 || Socorro || LINEAR || — || align=right | 2.4 km || 
|-id=881 bgcolor=#E9E9E9
| 322881 ||  || — || November 20, 2001 || Socorro || LINEAR || — || align=right | 2.7 km || 
|-id=882 bgcolor=#E9E9E9
| 322882 ||  || — || November 18, 2001 || Socorro || LINEAR || MAR || align=right | 1.7 km || 
|-id=883 bgcolor=#E9E9E9
| 322883 ||  || — || December 9, 2001 || Socorro || LINEAR || — || align=right | 3.4 km || 
|-id=884 bgcolor=#E9E9E9
| 322884 ||  || — || December 13, 2001 || Palomar || NEAT || — || align=right | 2.0 km || 
|-id=885 bgcolor=#E9E9E9
| 322885 ||  || — || December 9, 2001 || Socorro || LINEAR || — || align=right | 2.3 km || 
|-id=886 bgcolor=#E9E9E9
| 322886 ||  || — || December 9, 2001 || Socorro || LINEAR || — || align=right | 4.0 km || 
|-id=887 bgcolor=#E9E9E9
| 322887 ||  || — || December 11, 2001 || Socorro || LINEAR || — || align=right | 3.6 km || 
|-id=888 bgcolor=#E9E9E9
| 322888 ||  || — || November 12, 2001 || Socorro || LINEAR || — || align=right | 3.5 km || 
|-id=889 bgcolor=#E9E9E9
| 322889 ||  || — || December 11, 2001 || Socorro || LINEAR || — || align=right | 1.3 km || 
|-id=890 bgcolor=#E9E9E9
| 322890 ||  || — || December 14, 2001 || Socorro || LINEAR || DOR || align=right | 2.3 km || 
|-id=891 bgcolor=#E9E9E9
| 322891 ||  || — || December 14, 2001 || Socorro || LINEAR || DOR || align=right | 2.5 km || 
|-id=892 bgcolor=#E9E9E9
| 322892 ||  || — || December 14, 2001 || Socorro || LINEAR || — || align=right | 3.2 km || 
|-id=893 bgcolor=#E9E9E9
| 322893 ||  || — || December 14, 2001 || Socorro || LINEAR || — || align=right | 3.2 km || 
|-id=894 bgcolor=#E9E9E9
| 322894 ||  || — || December 9, 2001 || Kitt Peak || Spacewatch || — || align=right | 3.3 km || 
|-id=895 bgcolor=#E9E9E9
| 322895 ||  || — || December 11, 2001 || Socorro || LINEAR || — || align=right | 3.2 km || 
|-id=896 bgcolor=#E9E9E9
| 322896 ||  || — || December 15, 2001 || Socorro || LINEAR || — || align=right | 2.9 km || 
|-id=897 bgcolor=#E9E9E9
| 322897 ||  || — || December 16, 2001 || Pla D'Arguines || Pla D'Arguines Obs. || — || align=right | 1.7 km || 
|-id=898 bgcolor=#E9E9E9
| 322898 ||  || — || December 17, 2001 || Socorro || LINEAR || GEF || align=right | 1.7 km || 
|-id=899 bgcolor=#E9E9E9
| 322899 ||  || — || December 18, 2001 || Socorro || LINEAR || DOR || align=right | 3.3 km || 
|-id=900 bgcolor=#fefefe
| 322900 ||  || — || December 18, 2001 || Socorro || LINEAR || H || align=right data-sort-value="0.91" | 910 m || 
|}

322901–323000 

|-bgcolor=#E9E9E9
| 322901 ||  || — || December 14, 2001 || Needville || Needville Obs. || — || align=right | 2.8 km || 
|-id=902 bgcolor=#E9E9E9
| 322902 ||  || — || December 18, 2001 || Socorro || LINEAR || — || align=right | 2.2 km || 
|-id=903 bgcolor=#E9E9E9
| 322903 ||  || — || December 25, 2001 || Kitt Peak || Spacewatch || WIT || align=right | 1.4 km || 
|-id=904 bgcolor=#E9E9E9
| 322904 ||  || — || January 5, 2002 || Socorro || LINEAR || PAL || align=right | 2.2 km || 
|-id=905 bgcolor=#E9E9E9
| 322905 ||  || — || January 6, 2002 || Kitt Peak || Spacewatch || AGN || align=right | 1.4 km || 
|-id=906 bgcolor=#E9E9E9
| 322906 ||  || — || January 6, 2002 || Socorro || LINEAR || — || align=right | 3.2 km || 
|-id=907 bgcolor=#E9E9E9
| 322907 ||  || — || January 9, 2002 || Socorro || LINEAR || DOR || align=right | 2.4 km || 
|-id=908 bgcolor=#E9E9E9
| 322908 ||  || — || January 9, 2002 || Socorro || LINEAR || — || align=right | 2.9 km || 
|-id=909 bgcolor=#d6d6d6
| 322909 ||  || — || January 8, 2002 || Socorro || LINEAR || — || align=right | 2.5 km || 
|-id=910 bgcolor=#E9E9E9
| 322910 ||  || — || December 14, 2001 || Kitt Peak || Spacewatch || — || align=right | 1.9 km || 
|-id=911 bgcolor=#fefefe
| 322911 ||  || — || January 13, 2002 || Kitt Peak || Spacewatch || — || align=right | 1.0 km || 
|-id=912 bgcolor=#fefefe
| 322912 Jedlik ||  ||  || January 11, 2002 || Piszkéstető || K. Sárneczky, Z. Heiner || — || align=right data-sort-value="0.71" | 710 m || 
|-id=913 bgcolor=#FFC2E0
| 322913 ||  || — || February 3, 2002 || Haleakala || NEAT || AMO +1km || align=right | 1.6 km || 
|-id=914 bgcolor=#fefefe
| 322914 ||  || — || February 6, 2002 || Anderson Mesa || LONEOS || — || align=right data-sort-value="0.91" | 910 m || 
|-id=915 bgcolor=#fefefe
| 322915 ||  || — || February 10, 2002 || Socorro || LINEAR || FLO || align=right data-sort-value="0.74" | 740 m || 
|-id=916 bgcolor=#E9E9E9
| 322916 ||  || — || February 8, 2002 || Kitt Peak || Spacewatch || AST || align=right | 1.6 km || 
|-id=917 bgcolor=#E9E9E9
| 322917 ||  || — || February 10, 2002 || Kitt Peak || Spacewatch || — || align=right | 3.7 km || 
|-id=918 bgcolor=#E9E9E9
| 322918 ||  || — || February 10, 2002 || Socorro || LINEAR || AGN || align=right | 1.5 km || 
|-id=919 bgcolor=#d6d6d6
| 322919 ||  || — || February 10, 2002 || Socorro || LINEAR || — || align=right | 4.0 km || 
|-id=920 bgcolor=#d6d6d6
| 322920 ||  || — || January 6, 2002 || Kitt Peak || Spacewatch || — || align=right | 3.4 km || 
|-id=921 bgcolor=#fefefe
| 322921 ||  || — || February 10, 2002 || Socorro || LINEAR || — || align=right data-sort-value="0.93" | 930 m || 
|-id=922 bgcolor=#fefefe
| 322922 ||  || — || February 8, 2002 || Kitt Peak || Spacewatch || — || align=right data-sort-value="0.98" | 980 m || 
|-id=923 bgcolor=#d6d6d6
| 322923 ||  || — || February 8, 2002 || Palomar || NEAT || BRA || align=right | 2.1 km || 
|-id=924 bgcolor=#E9E9E9
| 322924 ||  || — || February 10, 2002 || Socorro || LINEAR || — || align=right | 3.0 km || 
|-id=925 bgcolor=#d6d6d6
| 322925 || 2002 DL || — || February 16, 2002 || Bohyunsan || Y.-B. Jeon, B.-C. Lee || — || align=right | 2.9 km || 
|-id=926 bgcolor=#d6d6d6
| 322926 ||  || — || February 20, 2002 || Kitt Peak || Spacewatch || — || align=right | 3.3 km || 
|-id=927 bgcolor=#E9E9E9
| 322927 ||  || — || February 16, 2002 || Palomar || NEAT || GEF || align=right | 1.4 km || 
|-id=928 bgcolor=#d6d6d6
| 322928 ||  || — || March 6, 2002 || Siding Spring || R. H. McNaught || — || align=right | 3.1 km || 
|-id=929 bgcolor=#d6d6d6
| 322929 ||  || — || March 12, 2002 || Palomar || NEAT || — || align=right | 2.0 km || 
|-id=930 bgcolor=#fefefe
| 322930 ||  || — || March 9, 2002 || Socorro || LINEAR || — || align=right data-sort-value="0.99" | 990 m || 
|-id=931 bgcolor=#d6d6d6
| 322931 ||  || — || March 14, 2002 || Socorro || LINEAR || — || align=right | 2.8 km || 
|-id=932 bgcolor=#d6d6d6
| 322932 ||  || — || March 12, 2002 || Kitt Peak || Spacewatch || — || align=right | 3.2 km || 
|-id=933 bgcolor=#fefefe
| 322933 ||  || — || March 12, 2002 || Socorro || LINEAR || — || align=right data-sort-value="0.82" | 820 m || 
|-id=934 bgcolor=#d6d6d6
| 322934 ||  || — || March 12, 2002 || Palomar || NEAT || BRA || align=right | 1.9 km || 
|-id=935 bgcolor=#fefefe
| 322935 ||  || — || March 13, 2002 || Palomar || NEAT || — || align=right data-sort-value="0.91" | 910 m || 
|-id=936 bgcolor=#fefefe
| 322936 ||  || — || March 5, 2002 || Kitt Peak || Spacewatch || FLO || align=right data-sort-value="0.75" | 750 m || 
|-id=937 bgcolor=#fefefe
| 322937 ||  || — || April 2, 2002 || Palomar || NEAT || fast? || align=right data-sort-value="0.96" | 960 m || 
|-id=938 bgcolor=#d6d6d6
| 322938 ||  || — || April 12, 2002 || Haleakala || NEAT || — || align=right | 2.9 km || 
|-id=939 bgcolor=#d6d6d6
| 322939 ||  || — || April 15, 2002 || Palomar || NEAT || — || align=right | 3.9 km || 
|-id=940 bgcolor=#d6d6d6
| 322940 ||  || — || April 5, 2002 || Anderson Mesa || LONEOS || — || align=right | 3.1 km || 
|-id=941 bgcolor=#fefefe
| 322941 ||  || — || April 9, 2002 || Anderson Mesa || LONEOS || — || align=right data-sort-value="0.87" | 870 m || 
|-id=942 bgcolor=#d6d6d6
| 322942 ||  || — || April 9, 2002 || Socorro || LINEAR || — || align=right | 2.1 km || 
|-id=943 bgcolor=#d6d6d6
| 322943 ||  || — || April 10, 2002 || Terskol || Terskol Obs. || — || align=right | 5.0 km || 
|-id=944 bgcolor=#fefefe
| 322944 ||  || — || April 11, 2002 || Socorro || LINEAR || FLO || align=right data-sort-value="0.85" | 850 m || 
|-id=945 bgcolor=#d6d6d6
| 322945 ||  || — || April 12, 2002 || Socorro || LINEAR || — || align=right | 2.5 km || 
|-id=946 bgcolor=#fefefe
| 322946 ||  || — || April 13, 2002 || Kitt Peak || Spacewatch || — || align=right data-sort-value="0.68" | 680 m || 
|-id=947 bgcolor=#fefefe
| 322947 ||  || — || April 13, 2002 || Palomar || NEAT || H || align=right data-sort-value="0.79" | 790 m || 
|-id=948 bgcolor=#d6d6d6
| 322948 ||  || — || April 14, 2002 || Palomar || NEAT || — || align=right | 3.4 km || 
|-id=949 bgcolor=#d6d6d6
| 322949 ||  || — || April 9, 2002 || Socorro || LINEAR || IMH || align=right | 3.2 km || 
|-id=950 bgcolor=#fefefe
| 322950 ||  || — || April 8, 2002 || Kitt Peak || Spacewatch || — || align=right data-sort-value="0.75" | 750 m || 
|-id=951 bgcolor=#fefefe
| 322951 ||  || — || October 22, 2003 || Apache Point || SDSS || — || align=right | 1.0 km || 
|-id=952 bgcolor=#fefefe
| 322952 ||  || — || April 18, 2002 || Haleakala || NEAT || — || align=right | 1.1 km || 
|-id=953 bgcolor=#d6d6d6
| 322953 ||  || — || March 15, 2007 || Kitt Peak || Spacewatch || — || align=right | 2.8 km || 
|-id=954 bgcolor=#fefefe
| 322954 ||  || — || May 7, 2002 || Socorro || LINEAR || H || align=right data-sort-value="0.94" | 940 m || 
|-id=955 bgcolor=#fefefe
| 322955 ||  || — || May 9, 2002 || Socorro || LINEAR || FLO || align=right data-sort-value="0.94" | 940 m || 
|-id=956 bgcolor=#fefefe
| 322956 ||  || — || May 10, 2002 || Socorro || LINEAR || — || align=right | 1.3 km || 
|-id=957 bgcolor=#fefefe
| 322957 ||  || — || May 8, 2002 || Anderson Mesa || LONEOS || FLO || align=right data-sort-value="0.71" | 710 m || 
|-id=958 bgcolor=#fefefe
| 322958 ||  || — || May 11, 2002 || Socorro || LINEAR || — || align=right data-sort-value="0.90" | 900 m || 
|-id=959 bgcolor=#d6d6d6
| 322959 ||  || — || May 11, 2002 || Socorro || LINEAR || — || align=right | 3.5 km || 
|-id=960 bgcolor=#d6d6d6
| 322960 ||  || — || May 4, 2002 || Palomar || NEAT || EOS || align=right | 4.3 km || 
|-id=961 bgcolor=#d6d6d6
| 322961 ||  || — || May 5, 2002 || Anderson Mesa || LONEOS || FIR || align=right | 4.8 km || 
|-id=962 bgcolor=#d6d6d6
| 322962 ||  || — || May 7, 2002 || Kitt Peak || Spacewatch || HYG || align=right | 3.7 km || 
|-id=963 bgcolor=#fefefe
| 322963 ||  || — || May 7, 2002 || Palomar || NEAT || — || align=right | 1.1 km || 
|-id=964 bgcolor=#fefefe
| 322964 ||  || — || May 10, 2002 || Anderson Mesa || LONEOS || — || align=right | 1.0 km || 
|-id=965 bgcolor=#fefefe
| 322965 ||  || — || February 14, 2005 || Kitt Peak || Spacewatch || FLO || align=right data-sort-value="0.68" | 680 m || 
|-id=966 bgcolor=#FFC2E0
| 322966 ||  || — || May 22, 2002 || Socorro || LINEAR || AMO +1km || align=right | 1.5 km || 
|-id=967 bgcolor=#fefefe
| 322967 ||  || — || May 30, 2002 || Palomar || NEAT || — || align=right | 1.0 km || 
|-id=968 bgcolor=#fefefe
| 322968 ||  || — || May 18, 2002 || Palomar || NEAT || — || align=right data-sort-value="0.62" | 620 m || 
|-id=969 bgcolor=#d6d6d6
| 322969 ||  || — || May 23, 2002 || Palomar || NEAT || MEL || align=right | 4.6 km || 
|-id=970 bgcolor=#fefefe
| 322970 ||  || — || June 5, 2002 || Socorro || LINEAR || — || align=right data-sort-value="0.93" | 930 m || 
|-id=971 bgcolor=#fefefe
| 322971 ||  || — || June 6, 2002 || Socorro || LINEAR || — || align=right | 1.1 km || 
|-id=972 bgcolor=#d6d6d6
| 322972 ||  || — || June 8, 2002 || Socorro || LINEAR || EUP || align=right | 6.2 km || 
|-id=973 bgcolor=#fefefe
| 322973 ||  || — || June 11, 2002 || Anderson Mesa || LONEOS || — || align=right | 1.3 km || 
|-id=974 bgcolor=#fefefe
| 322974 ||  || — || June 12, 2002 || Palomar || NEAT || — || align=right data-sort-value="0.92" | 920 m || 
|-id=975 bgcolor=#d6d6d6
| 322975 ||  || — || June 13, 2002 || Palomar || NEAT || — || align=right | 3.4 km || 
|-id=976 bgcolor=#fefefe
| 322976 ||  || — || June 16, 2002 || Palomar || NEAT || H || align=right data-sort-value="0.85" | 850 m || 
|-id=977 bgcolor=#fefefe
| 322977 ||  || — || June 23, 2002 || Palomar || NEAT || — || align=right data-sort-value="0.97" | 970 m || 
|-id=978 bgcolor=#d6d6d6
| 322978 ||  || — || March 22, 2001 || Kitt Peak || Spacewatch || — || align=right | 3.7 km || 
|-id=979 bgcolor=#fefefe
| 322979 ||  || — || July 9, 2002 || Palomar || NEAT || — || align=right | 1.4 km || 
|-id=980 bgcolor=#fefefe
| 322980 ||  || — || July 9, 2002 || Socorro || LINEAR || — || align=right data-sort-value="0.81" | 810 m || 
|-id=981 bgcolor=#d6d6d6
| 322981 ||  || — || July 13, 2002 || Palomar || NEAT || — || align=right | 7.3 km || 
|-id=982 bgcolor=#fefefe
| 322982 ||  || — || July 14, 2002 || Palomar || NEAT || NYS || align=right data-sort-value="0.71" | 710 m || 
|-id=983 bgcolor=#d6d6d6
| 322983 ||  || — || July 4, 2002 || Palomar || NEAT || — || align=right | 3.6 km || 
|-id=984 bgcolor=#d6d6d6
| 322984 ||  || — || July 14, 2002 || Palomar || NEAT || HYG || align=right | 3.6 km || 
|-id=985 bgcolor=#fefefe
| 322985 ||  || — || July 9, 2002 || Palomar || NEAT || H || align=right data-sort-value="0.62" | 620 m || 
|-id=986 bgcolor=#fefefe
| 322986 ||  || — || July 15, 2002 || Palomar || NEAT || V || align=right data-sort-value="0.64" | 640 m || 
|-id=987 bgcolor=#fefefe
| 322987 ||  || — || July 14, 2002 || Palomar || NEAT || V || align=right data-sort-value="0.75" | 750 m || 
|-id=988 bgcolor=#d6d6d6
| 322988 ||  || — || July 12, 2002 || Palomar || NEAT || — || align=right | 2.5 km || 
|-id=989 bgcolor=#d6d6d6
| 322989 ||  || — || July 20, 2002 || Palomar || NEAT || — || align=right | 4.1 km || 
|-id=990 bgcolor=#fefefe
| 322990 ||  || — || July 22, 2002 || Palomar || NEAT || NYS || align=right data-sort-value="0.86" | 860 m || 
|-id=991 bgcolor=#d6d6d6
| 322991 ||  || — || July 18, 2002 || Socorro || LINEAR || — || align=right | 4.5 km || 
|-id=992 bgcolor=#fefefe
| 322992 ||  || — || July 17, 2002 || Socorro || LINEAR || — || align=right | 1.5 km || 
|-id=993 bgcolor=#fefefe
| 322993 ||  || — || July 18, 2002 || Socorro || LINEAR || H || align=right data-sort-value="0.79" | 790 m || 
|-id=994 bgcolor=#fefefe
| 322994 ||  || — || July 30, 2002 || Lake Tekapo || Mount John Obs. || H || align=right data-sort-value="0.84" | 840 m || 
|-id=995 bgcolor=#d6d6d6
| 322995 ||  || — || July 21, 2002 || Palomar || NEAT || — || align=right | 3.1 km || 
|-id=996 bgcolor=#d6d6d6
| 322996 ||  || — || July 20, 2002 || Palomar || NEAT || — || align=right | 3.9 km || 
|-id=997 bgcolor=#fefefe
| 322997 ||  || — || July 22, 2002 || Palomar || NEAT || FLO || align=right data-sort-value="0.70" | 700 m || 
|-id=998 bgcolor=#fefefe
| 322998 ||  || — || September 27, 2006 || Kitt Peak || Spacewatch || — || align=right data-sort-value="0.74" | 740 m || 
|-id=999 bgcolor=#d6d6d6
| 322999 ||  || — || July 29, 2002 || Palomar || NEAT || — || align=right | 4.1 km || 
|-id=000 bgcolor=#fefefe
| 323000 ||  || — || August 6, 2002 || Palomar || NEAT || NYS || align=right data-sort-value="0.74" | 740 m || 
|}

References

External links 
 Discovery Circumstances: Numbered Minor Planets (320001)–(325000) (IAU Minor Planet Center)

0322